

581001–581100 

|-bgcolor=#E9E9E9
| 581001 ||  || — || January 22, 2015 || Haleakala || Pan-STARRS ||  || align=right | 1.4 km || 
|-id=002 bgcolor=#fefefe
| 581002 ||  || — || December 30, 2014 || Haleakala || Pan-STARRS || H || align=right data-sort-value="0.67" | 670 m || 
|-id=003 bgcolor=#E9E9E9
| 581003 ||  || — || December 17, 2009 || Mount Lemmon || Mount Lemmon Survey ||  || align=right | 2.0 km || 
|-id=004 bgcolor=#E9E9E9
| 581004 ||  || — || January 9, 2006 || Kitt Peak || Spacewatch ||  || align=right | 2.1 km || 
|-id=005 bgcolor=#fefefe
| 581005 ||  || — || April 28, 2001 || Kitt Peak || Spacewatch ||  || align=right data-sort-value="0.61" | 610 m || 
|-id=006 bgcolor=#E9E9E9
| 581006 ||  || — || March 16, 2015 || Haleakala || Pan-STARRS ||  || align=right | 1.5 km || 
|-id=007 bgcolor=#E9E9E9
| 581007 ||  || — || January 26, 2001 || Kitt Peak || Spacewatch ||  || align=right | 1.9 km || 
|-id=008 bgcolor=#d6d6d6
| 581008 ||  || — || December 31, 2008 || Kitt Peak || Spacewatch ||  || align=right | 2.1 km || 
|-id=009 bgcolor=#d6d6d6
| 581009 ||  || — || March 16, 2015 || Haleakala || Pan-STARRS ||  || align=right | 2.2 km || 
|-id=010 bgcolor=#fefefe
| 581010 ||  || — || March 16, 2015 || Haleakala || Pan-STARRS ||  || align=right data-sort-value="0.71" | 710 m || 
|-id=011 bgcolor=#E9E9E9
| 581011 ||  || — || February 18, 2015 || Haleakala || Pan-STARRS ||  || align=right | 1.6 km || 
|-id=012 bgcolor=#E9E9E9
| 581012 ||  || — || February 18, 2015 || Haleakala || Pan-STARRS ||  || align=right | 2.0 km || 
|-id=013 bgcolor=#E9E9E9
| 581013 ||  || — || December 1, 2013 || Crni Vrh || J. Vales ||  || align=right | 2.7 km || 
|-id=014 bgcolor=#E9E9E9
| 581014 ||  || — || February 6, 2010 || Mount Lemmon || Mount Lemmon Survey ||  || align=right | 2.5 km || 
|-id=015 bgcolor=#d6d6d6
| 581015 ||  || — || December 28, 2013 || Kitt Peak || Spacewatch ||  || align=right | 2.3 km || 
|-id=016 bgcolor=#E9E9E9
| 581016 ||  || — || March 16, 2015 || Haleakala || Pan-STARRS ||  || align=right | 2.2 km || 
|-id=017 bgcolor=#E9E9E9
| 581017 ||  || — || March 16, 2015 || Haleakala || Pan-STARRS ||  || align=right | 2.1 km || 
|-id=018 bgcolor=#fefefe
| 581018 ||  || — || March 19, 2004 || Palomar || NEAT || H || align=right data-sort-value="0.55" | 550 m || 
|-id=019 bgcolor=#E9E9E9
| 581019 ||  || — || February 27, 2015 || Mount Lemmon || Mount Lemmon Survey ||  || align=right | 2.5 km || 
|-id=020 bgcolor=#E9E9E9
| 581020 ||  || — || March 16, 2015 || Haleakala || Pan-STARRS ||  || align=right | 1.5 km || 
|-id=021 bgcolor=#E9E9E9
| 581021 ||  || — || September 28, 2003 || Anderson Mesa || LONEOS ||  || align=right | 2.6 km || 
|-id=022 bgcolor=#E9E9E9
| 581022 ||  || — || January 17, 2015 || Haleakala || Pan-STARRS ||  || align=right | 1.8 km || 
|-id=023 bgcolor=#FA8072
| 581023 ||  || — || October 21, 2011 || Catalina || CSS || H || align=right data-sort-value="0.72" | 720 m || 
|-id=024 bgcolor=#fefefe
| 581024 ||  || — || March 22, 2015 || Haleakala || Pan-STARRS || H || align=right data-sort-value="0.57" | 570 m || 
|-id=025 bgcolor=#E9E9E9
| 581025 ||  || — || December 20, 2004 || Mount Lemmon || Mount Lemmon Survey ||  || align=right | 2.7 km || 
|-id=026 bgcolor=#E9E9E9
| 581026 ||  || — || April 15, 2011 || Haleakala || Pan-STARRS ||  || align=right data-sort-value="0.68" | 680 m || 
|-id=027 bgcolor=#d6d6d6
| 581027 ||  || — || March 17, 2015 || Haleakala || Pan-STARRS ||  || align=right | 1.9 km || 
|-id=028 bgcolor=#E9E9E9
| 581028 ||  || — || September 19, 2008 || Kitt Peak || Spacewatch ||  || align=right data-sort-value="0.81" | 810 m || 
|-id=029 bgcolor=#E9E9E9
| 581029 ||  || — || November 27, 2013 || Haleakala || Pan-STARRS ||  || align=right | 1.2 km || 
|-id=030 bgcolor=#d6d6d6
| 581030 ||  || — || October 3, 2013 || Kitt Peak || Spacewatch ||  || align=right | 2.3 km || 
|-id=031 bgcolor=#fefefe
| 581031 ||  || — || February 19, 2012 || Catalina || CSS || H || align=right data-sort-value="0.81" | 810 m || 
|-id=032 bgcolor=#d6d6d6
| 581032 ||  || — || October 13, 2007 || Mount Lemmon || Mount Lemmon Survey ||  || align=right | 2.0 km || 
|-id=033 bgcolor=#d6d6d6
| 581033 ||  || — || March 17, 2015 || Haleakala || Pan-STARRS ||  || align=right | 2.3 km || 
|-id=034 bgcolor=#d6d6d6
| 581034 ||  || — || April 13, 2004 || Kitt Peak || Spacewatch ||  || align=right | 2.7 km || 
|-id=035 bgcolor=#d6d6d6
| 581035 ||  || — || September 5, 2000 || Apache Point || SDSS Collaboration ||  || align=right | 2.3 km || 
|-id=036 bgcolor=#E9E9E9
| 581036 ||  || — || January 29, 2011 || Kitt Peak || Spacewatch ||  || align=right data-sort-value="0.92" | 920 m || 
|-id=037 bgcolor=#fefefe
| 581037 ||  || — || March 8, 2008 || Mount Lemmon || Mount Lemmon Survey ||  || align=right data-sort-value="0.71" | 710 m || 
|-id=038 bgcolor=#E9E9E9
| 581038 ||  || — || March 9, 2011 || Mount Lemmon || Mount Lemmon Survey ||  || align=right | 1.5 km || 
|-id=039 bgcolor=#E9E9E9
| 581039 ||  || — || January 16, 2015 || Haleakala || Pan-STARRS ||  || align=right | 1.7 km || 
|-id=040 bgcolor=#E9E9E9
| 581040 ||  || — || January 25, 2015 || Haleakala || Pan-STARRS ||  || align=right | 1.5 km || 
|-id=041 bgcolor=#E9E9E9
| 581041 ||  || — || January 24, 2015 || Haleakala || Pan-STARRS ||  || align=right data-sort-value="0.91" | 910 m || 
|-id=042 bgcolor=#E9E9E9
| 581042 ||  || — || March 9, 2007 || Kitt Peak || Spacewatch ||  || align=right | 1.2 km || 
|-id=043 bgcolor=#E9E9E9
| 581043 ||  || — || March 27, 2007 || Mount Lemmon || Mount Lemmon Survey ||  || align=right | 1.8 km || 
|-id=044 bgcolor=#d6d6d6
| 581044 ||  || — || January 24, 2015 || Haleakala || Pan-STARRS ||  || align=right | 2.9 km || 
|-id=045 bgcolor=#E9E9E9
| 581045 ||  || — || March 18, 2015 || Haleakala || Pan-STARRS ||  || align=right | 1.2 km || 
|-id=046 bgcolor=#E9E9E9
| 581046 ||  || — || June 16, 2012 || Mount Lemmon || Mount Lemmon Survey ||  || align=right | 1.7 km || 
|-id=047 bgcolor=#d6d6d6
| 581047 ||  || — || February 20, 2015 || Haleakala || Pan-STARRS ||  || align=right | 2.5 km || 
|-id=048 bgcolor=#E9E9E9
| 581048 ||  || — || January 26, 2015 || Haleakala || Pan-STARRS ||  || align=right | 1.7 km || 
|-id=049 bgcolor=#d6d6d6
| 581049 ||  || — || November 27, 2013 || Haleakala || Pan-STARRS ||  || align=right | 3.1 km || 
|-id=050 bgcolor=#E9E9E9
| 581050 ||  || — || March 18, 2015 || Haleakala || Pan-STARRS ||  || align=right | 1.4 km || 
|-id=051 bgcolor=#fefefe
| 581051 ||  || — || February 16, 2015 || Haleakala || Pan-STARRS ||  || align=right data-sort-value="0.72" | 720 m || 
|-id=052 bgcolor=#E9E9E9
| 581052 ||  || — || March 18, 2015 || Haleakala || Pan-STARRS ||  || align=right | 1.9 km || 
|-id=053 bgcolor=#d6d6d6
| 581053 ||  || — || November 14, 2012 || Mount Lemmon || Mount Lemmon Survey ||  || align=right | 3.1 km || 
|-id=054 bgcolor=#d6d6d6
| 581054 ||  || — || March 17, 2015 || Haleakala || Pan-STARRS ||  || align=right | 3.2 km || 
|-id=055 bgcolor=#E9E9E9
| 581055 ||  || — || December 19, 2009 || Mount Lemmon || Mount Lemmon Survey ||  || align=right | 1.2 km || 
|-id=056 bgcolor=#E9E9E9
| 581056 ||  || — || April 9, 2006 || Kitt Peak || Spacewatch ||  || align=right | 2.2 km || 
|-id=057 bgcolor=#d6d6d6
| 581057 ||  || — || September 17, 2006 || Kitt Peak || Spacewatch ||  || align=right | 2.7 km || 
|-id=058 bgcolor=#E9E9E9
| 581058 ||  || — || August 26, 2012 || Haleakala || Pan-STARRS ||  || align=right | 1.9 km || 
|-id=059 bgcolor=#E9E9E9
| 581059 ||  || — || January 25, 2015 || Haleakala || Pan-STARRS ||  || align=right | 1.4 km || 
|-id=060 bgcolor=#d6d6d6
| 581060 ||  || — || May 8, 2005 || Mount Lemmon || Mount Lemmon Survey ||  || align=right | 2.4 km || 
|-id=061 bgcolor=#d6d6d6
| 581061 ||  || — || October 13, 2007 || Mount Lemmon || Mount Lemmon Survey ||  || align=right | 1.9 km || 
|-id=062 bgcolor=#d6d6d6
| 581062 ||  || — || March 18, 2015 || Haleakala || Pan-STARRS ||  || align=right | 2.1 km || 
|-id=063 bgcolor=#d6d6d6
| 581063 ||  || — || March 2, 2009 || Kitt Peak || Spacewatch ||  || align=right | 2.2 km || 
|-id=064 bgcolor=#d6d6d6
| 581064 ||  || — || March 18, 2015 || Haleakala || Pan-STARRS ||  || align=right | 2.0 km || 
|-id=065 bgcolor=#d6d6d6
| 581065 ||  || — || November 4, 2007 || Mount Lemmon || Mount Lemmon Survey ||  || align=right | 2.7 km || 
|-id=066 bgcolor=#E9E9E9
| 581066 ||  || — || April 6, 2011 || Siding Spring || SSS ||  || align=right | 2.9 km || 
|-id=067 bgcolor=#fefefe
| 581067 ||  || — || October 17, 2003 || Kitt Peak || Spacewatch ||  || align=right data-sort-value="0.82" | 820 m || 
|-id=068 bgcolor=#E9E9E9
| 581068 ||  || — || July 1, 2008 || Catalina || CSS ||  || align=right | 1.7 km || 
|-id=069 bgcolor=#d6d6d6
| 581069 ||  || — || January 26, 2015 || Haleakala || Pan-STARRS ||  || align=right | 2.3 km || 
|-id=070 bgcolor=#d6d6d6
| 581070 ||  || — || November 27, 2013 || Haleakala || Pan-STARRS ||  || align=right | 3.4 km || 
|-id=071 bgcolor=#d6d6d6
| 581071 ||  || — || March 20, 2015 || Haleakala || Pan-STARRS ||  || align=right | 2.1 km || 
|-id=072 bgcolor=#E9E9E9
| 581072 ||  || — || October 10, 2012 || Mount Lemmon || Mount Lemmon Survey ||  || align=right | 2.2 km || 
|-id=073 bgcolor=#d6d6d6
| 581073 ||  || — || September 25, 2012 || Mount Lemmon || Mount Lemmon Survey ||  || align=right | 2.3 km || 
|-id=074 bgcolor=#E9E9E9
| 581074 ||  || — || October 7, 2008 || Kitt Peak || Spacewatch ||  || align=right | 2.2 km || 
|-id=075 bgcolor=#E9E9E9
| 581075 ||  || — || May 8, 2011 || Kitt Peak || Spacewatch ||  || align=right | 1.9 km || 
|-id=076 bgcolor=#E9E9E9
| 581076 ||  || — || May 28, 2012 || Mount Lemmon || Mount Lemmon Survey ||  || align=right | 2.2 km || 
|-id=077 bgcolor=#fefefe
| 581077 ||  || — || January 28, 2015 || Haleakala || Pan-STARRS || H || align=right data-sort-value="0.59" | 590 m || 
|-id=078 bgcolor=#E9E9E9
| 581078 ||  || — || September 23, 2012 || Mayhill-ISON || L. Elenin ||  || align=right | 2.2 km || 
|-id=079 bgcolor=#E9E9E9
| 581079 ||  || — || March 20, 2015 || Haleakala || Pan-STARRS ||  || align=right | 1.8 km || 
|-id=080 bgcolor=#d6d6d6
| 581080 ||  || — || October 8, 2012 || Mount Lemmon || Mount Lemmon Survey ||  || align=right | 2.3 km || 
|-id=081 bgcolor=#d6d6d6
| 581081 ||  || — || October 16, 2012 || Mount Lemmon || Mount Lemmon Survey ||  || align=right | 2.8 km || 
|-id=082 bgcolor=#d6d6d6
| 581082 ||  || — || August 26, 2012 || Haleakala || Pan-STARRS ||  || align=right | 2.7 km || 
|-id=083 bgcolor=#E9E9E9
| 581083 ||  || — || November 1, 2008 || Kitt Peak || Spacewatch ||  || align=right | 1.9 km || 
|-id=084 bgcolor=#E9E9E9
| 581084 ||  || — || March 20, 2015 || Haleakala || Pan-STARRS ||  || align=right | 1.9 km || 
|-id=085 bgcolor=#C2FFFF
| 581085 ||  || — || September 3, 2008 || Kitt Peak || Spacewatch || L4 || align=right | 9.3 km || 
|-id=086 bgcolor=#E9E9E9
| 581086 ||  || — || November 20, 2004 || Kitt Peak || Spacewatch ||  || align=right | 2.2 km || 
|-id=087 bgcolor=#E9E9E9
| 581087 ||  || — || October 9, 2012 || Mount Lemmon || Mount Lemmon Survey ||  || align=right | 1.8 km || 
|-id=088 bgcolor=#d6d6d6
| 581088 ||  || — || December 14, 2013 || Mount Lemmon || Mount Lemmon Survey ||  || align=right | 2.2 km || 
|-id=089 bgcolor=#d6d6d6
| 581089 ||  || — || January 22, 2015 || Haleakala || Pan-STARRS ||  || align=right | 2.3 km || 
|-id=090 bgcolor=#d6d6d6
| 581090 ||  || — || November 12, 2007 || Mount Lemmon || Mount Lemmon Survey ||  || align=right | 2.9 km || 
|-id=091 bgcolor=#d6d6d6
| 581091 ||  || — || February 3, 2009 || Mount Lemmon || Mount Lemmon Survey ||  || align=right | 2.5 km || 
|-id=092 bgcolor=#E9E9E9
| 581092 ||  || — || October 16, 2003 || Kitt Peak || Spacewatch ||  || align=right | 2.0 km || 
|-id=093 bgcolor=#FA8072
| 581093 ||  || — || February 10, 2007 || Palomar || NEAT || H || align=right data-sort-value="0.61" | 610 m || 
|-id=094 bgcolor=#fefefe
| 581094 ||  || — || February 10, 2011 || Mount Lemmon || Mount Lemmon Survey ||  || align=right data-sort-value="0.76" | 760 m || 
|-id=095 bgcolor=#d6d6d6
| 581095 ||  || — || February 17, 2004 || Kitt Peak || Spacewatch ||  || align=right | 2.2 km || 
|-id=096 bgcolor=#C2FFFF
| 581096 ||  || — || January 18, 2013 || Haleakala || Pan-STARRS || L4 || align=right | 13 km || 
|-id=097 bgcolor=#E9E9E9
| 581097 ||  || — || March 13, 2011 || Mount Lemmon || Mount Lemmon Survey ||  || align=right | 1.9 km || 
|-id=098 bgcolor=#E9E9E9
| 581098 ||  || — || January 19, 2015 || Haleakala || Pan-STARRS ||  || align=right | 2.0 km || 
|-id=099 bgcolor=#E9E9E9
| 581099 ||  || — || November 11, 2013 || Kitt Peak || Spacewatch ||  || align=right | 1.4 km || 
|-id=100 bgcolor=#E9E9E9
| 581100 ||  || — || December 10, 2009 || Mount Lemmon || Mount Lemmon Survey ||  || align=right | 2.0 km || 
|}

581101–581200 

|-bgcolor=#E9E9E9
| 581101 ||  || — || November 6, 1996 || Kitt Peak || Spacewatch ||  || align=right | 1.8 km || 
|-id=102 bgcolor=#fefefe
| 581102 ||  || — || June 12, 2012 || Haleakala || Pan-STARRS ||  || align=right data-sort-value="0.71" | 710 m || 
|-id=103 bgcolor=#E9E9E9
| 581103 ||  || — || September 23, 2008 || Kitt Peak || Spacewatch ||  || align=right | 1.8 km || 
|-id=104 bgcolor=#E9E9E9
| 581104 ||  || — || February 16, 2015 || Haleakala || Pan-STARRS ||  || align=right | 1.8 km || 
|-id=105 bgcolor=#E9E9E9
| 581105 ||  || — || August 26, 2012 || Haleakala || Pan-STARRS ||  || align=right | 1.9 km || 
|-id=106 bgcolor=#d6d6d6
| 581106 ||  || — || August 21, 2006 || Kitt Peak || Spacewatch ||  || align=right | 2.7 km || 
|-id=107 bgcolor=#fefefe
| 581107 ||  || — || November 8, 2013 || Kitt Peak || Spacewatch ||  || align=right data-sort-value="0.62" | 620 m || 
|-id=108 bgcolor=#E9E9E9
| 581108 ||  || — || November 29, 2005 || Kitt Peak || Spacewatch ||  || align=right | 1.0 km || 
|-id=109 bgcolor=#d6d6d6
| 581109 ||  || — || March 21, 2015 || Haleakala || Pan-STARRS ||  || align=right | 1.8 km || 
|-id=110 bgcolor=#d6d6d6
| 581110 ||  || — || September 12, 2007 || Mount Lemmon || Mount Lemmon Survey ||  || align=right | 2.5 km || 
|-id=111 bgcolor=#d6d6d6
| 581111 ||  || — || March 13, 2004 || Palomar || NEAT ||  || align=right | 3.5 km || 
|-id=112 bgcolor=#d6d6d6
| 581112 ||  || — || February 2, 2009 || Kitt Peak || Spacewatch ||  || align=right | 2.3 km || 
|-id=113 bgcolor=#E9E9E9
| 581113 ||  || — || September 22, 2003 || Kitt Peak || Spacewatch ||  || align=right | 1.9 km || 
|-id=114 bgcolor=#d6d6d6
| 581114 ||  || — || March 18, 2010 || Mount Lemmon || Mount Lemmon Survey ||  || align=right | 1.9 km || 
|-id=115 bgcolor=#E9E9E9
| 581115 ||  || — || March 17, 2015 || Mount Lemmon || Mount Lemmon Survey ||  || align=right | 1.9 km || 
|-id=116 bgcolor=#fefefe
| 581116 ||  || — || January 23, 2015 || Haleakala || Pan-STARRS ||  || align=right data-sort-value="0.61" | 610 m || 
|-id=117 bgcolor=#E9E9E9
| 581117 ||  || — || July 25, 2008 || Mount Lemmon || Mount Lemmon Survey ||  || align=right data-sort-value="0.82" | 820 m || 
|-id=118 bgcolor=#E9E9E9
| 581118 ||  || — || May 2, 2006 || Mount Lemmon || Mount Lemmon Survey ||  || align=right | 1.9 km || 
|-id=119 bgcolor=#fefefe
| 581119 ||  || — || February 6, 2011 || Mount Lemmon || Mount Lemmon Survey || NYS || align=right data-sort-value="0.58" | 580 m || 
|-id=120 bgcolor=#E9E9E9
| 581120 ||  || — || March 21, 2015 || Haleakala || Pan-STARRS ||  || align=right | 1.8 km || 
|-id=121 bgcolor=#E9E9E9
| 581121 ||  || — || October 3, 2008 || Mount Lemmon || Mount Lemmon Survey ||  || align=right | 1.2 km || 
|-id=122 bgcolor=#E9E9E9
| 581122 ||  || — || September 28, 2003 || Kitt Peak || Spacewatch ||  || align=right | 1.9 km || 
|-id=123 bgcolor=#E9E9E9
| 581123 ||  || — || January 19, 2005 || Kitt Peak || Spacewatch || AGN || align=right | 1.3 km || 
|-id=124 bgcolor=#d6d6d6
| 581124 ||  || — || March 21, 2015 || Haleakala || Pan-STARRS ||  || align=right | 2.1 km || 
|-id=125 bgcolor=#E9E9E9
| 581125 ||  || — || February 23, 2015 || Haleakala || Pan-STARRS ||  || align=right | 1.8 km || 
|-id=126 bgcolor=#d6d6d6
| 581126 ||  || — || April 11, 2010 || Kitt Peak || Spacewatch ||  || align=right | 2.1 km || 
|-id=127 bgcolor=#E9E9E9
| 581127 ||  || — || March 23, 2006 || Kitt Peak || Spacewatch ||  || align=right | 1.8 km || 
|-id=128 bgcolor=#d6d6d6
| 581128 ||  || — || January 31, 2009 || Kitt Peak || Spacewatch || THM || align=right | 1.8 km || 
|-id=129 bgcolor=#d6d6d6
| 581129 ||  || — || October 11, 2012 || Mount Lemmon || Mount Lemmon Survey ||  || align=right | 2.2 km || 
|-id=130 bgcolor=#E9E9E9
| 581130 ||  || — || October 6, 2008 || Mount Lemmon || Mount Lemmon Survey ||  || align=right | 2.7 km || 
|-id=131 bgcolor=#d6d6d6
| 581131 ||  || — || March 21, 2015 || Haleakala || Pan-STARRS ||  || align=right | 1.8 km || 
|-id=132 bgcolor=#E9E9E9
| 581132 ||  || — || October 26, 2008 || Mount Lemmon || Mount Lemmon Survey ||  || align=right | 1.6 km || 
|-id=133 bgcolor=#E9E9E9
| 581133 ||  || — || April 6, 2011 || Mount Lemmon || Mount Lemmon Survey ||  || align=right | 1.4 km || 
|-id=134 bgcolor=#E9E9E9
| 581134 ||  || — || March 21, 2015 || Haleakala || Pan-STARRS ||  || align=right data-sort-value="0.75" | 750 m || 
|-id=135 bgcolor=#d6d6d6
| 581135 ||  || — || October 14, 2012 || ESA OGS || ESA OGS || KOR || align=right | 1.2 km || 
|-id=136 bgcolor=#d6d6d6
| 581136 ||  || — || November 8, 2007 || Kitt Peak || Spacewatch ||  || align=right | 2.4 km || 
|-id=137 bgcolor=#E9E9E9
| 581137 ||  || — || January 28, 2015 || Haleakala || Pan-STARRS ||  || align=right | 2.1 km || 
|-id=138 bgcolor=#d6d6d6
| 581138 ||  || — || September 24, 2011 || Haleakala || Pan-STARRS ||  || align=right | 3.3 km || 
|-id=139 bgcolor=#d6d6d6
| 581139 ||  || — || November 3, 2007 || Mount Lemmon || Mount Lemmon Survey ||  || align=right | 3.6 km || 
|-id=140 bgcolor=#d6d6d6
| 581140 ||  || — || January 1, 2014 || Haleakala || Pan-STARRS ||  || align=right | 2.1 km || 
|-id=141 bgcolor=#E9E9E9
| 581141 ||  || — || September 26, 2003 || Apache Point || SDSS Collaboration ||  || align=right | 1.9 km || 
|-id=142 bgcolor=#E9E9E9
| 581142 ||  || — || October 23, 2008 || Mount Lemmon || Mount Lemmon Survey ||  || align=right | 1.8 km || 
|-id=143 bgcolor=#fefefe
| 581143 ||  || — || January 17, 2007 || Kitt Peak || Spacewatch ||  || align=right data-sort-value="0.61" | 610 m || 
|-id=144 bgcolor=#d6d6d6
| 581144 ||  || — || January 23, 2015 || Haleakala || Pan-STARRS ||  || align=right | 2.7 km || 
|-id=145 bgcolor=#E9E9E9
| 581145 ||  || — || April 27, 2011 || Mount Lemmon || Mount Lemmon Survey ||  || align=right | 1.7 km || 
|-id=146 bgcolor=#d6d6d6
| 581146 ||  || — || March 10, 2005 || Kitt Peak || M. W. Buie, L. H. Wasserman ||  || align=right | 2.2 km || 
|-id=147 bgcolor=#E9E9E9
| 581147 ||  || — || July 5, 2003 || Kitt Peak || Spacewatch ||  || align=right | 2.5 km || 
|-id=148 bgcolor=#fefefe
| 581148 ||  || — || March 6, 2011 || Mount Lemmon || Mount Lemmon Survey ||  || align=right data-sort-value="0.82" | 820 m || 
|-id=149 bgcolor=#fefefe
| 581149 ||  || — || October 23, 2013 || Mount Lemmon || Mount Lemmon Survey ||  || align=right data-sort-value="0.68" | 680 m || 
|-id=150 bgcolor=#d6d6d6
| 581150 ||  || — || October 5, 2012 || Haleakala || Pan-STARRS ||  || align=right | 1.8 km || 
|-id=151 bgcolor=#E9E9E9
| 581151 ||  || — || January 7, 2006 || Kitt Peak || Spacewatch ||  || align=right | 1.2 km || 
|-id=152 bgcolor=#E9E9E9
| 581152 ||  || — || January 23, 2015 || Haleakala || Pan-STARRS ||  || align=right | 1.6 km || 
|-id=153 bgcolor=#E9E9E9
| 581153 ||  || — || November 7, 2008 || Mount Lemmon || Mount Lemmon Survey ||  || align=right | 1.9 km || 
|-id=154 bgcolor=#E9E9E9
| 581154 ||  || — || September 20, 2003 || Kitt Peak || Spacewatch ||  || align=right | 2.0 km || 
|-id=155 bgcolor=#E9E9E9
| 581155 ||  || — || October 26, 2009 || Mount Lemmon || Mount Lemmon Survey ||  || align=right | 1.2 km || 
|-id=156 bgcolor=#E9E9E9
| 581156 ||  || — || September 4, 2008 || Kitt Peak || Spacewatch ||  || align=right | 1.8 km || 
|-id=157 bgcolor=#E9E9E9
| 581157 ||  || — || January 30, 2006 || Kitt Peak || Spacewatch ||  || align=right | 1.3 km || 
|-id=158 bgcolor=#d6d6d6
| 581158 ||  || — || February 24, 2015 || Haleakala || Pan-STARRS ||  || align=right | 2.5 km || 
|-id=159 bgcolor=#E9E9E9
| 581159 ||  || — || January 2, 1997 || Kitt Peak || Spacewatch ||  || align=right | 1.4 km || 
|-id=160 bgcolor=#E9E9E9
| 581160 ||  || — || November 7, 2005 || Mauna Kea || Mauna Kea Obs. ||  || align=right | 1.3 km || 
|-id=161 bgcolor=#d6d6d6
| 581161 ||  || — || February 13, 2004 || Palomar || NEAT ||  || align=right | 3.5 km || 
|-id=162 bgcolor=#E9E9E9
| 581162 ||  || — || October 1, 2008 || Mount Lemmon || Mount Lemmon Survey ||  || align=right | 1.4 km || 
|-id=163 bgcolor=#E9E9E9
| 581163 ||  || — || December 19, 2009 || Mount Lemmon || Mount Lemmon Survey ||  || align=right | 1.8 km || 
|-id=164 bgcolor=#E9E9E9
| 581164 ||  || — || January 23, 2006 || Kitt Peak || Spacewatch ||  || align=right | 1.9 km || 
|-id=165 bgcolor=#fefefe
| 581165 ||  || — || March 10, 2008 || Kitt Peak || Spacewatch ||  || align=right data-sort-value="0.66" | 660 m || 
|-id=166 bgcolor=#E9E9E9
| 581166 ||  || — || February 24, 2015 || Haleakala || Pan-STARRS ||  || align=right | 1.1 km || 
|-id=167 bgcolor=#E9E9E9
| 581167 ||  || — || September 25, 2008 || Mount Lemmon || Mount Lemmon Survey ||  || align=right | 2.2 km || 
|-id=168 bgcolor=#fefefe
| 581168 ||  || — || February 5, 2011 || Mount Lemmon || Mount Lemmon Survey ||  || align=right data-sort-value="0.78" | 780 m || 
|-id=169 bgcolor=#d6d6d6
| 581169 ||  || — || August 23, 2007 || Kitt Peak || Spacewatch ||  || align=right | 2.6 km || 
|-id=170 bgcolor=#E9E9E9
| 581170 ||  || — || October 16, 2003 || Kitt Peak || Spacewatch ||  || align=right | 2.3 km || 
|-id=171 bgcolor=#E9E9E9
| 581171 ||  || — || January 23, 2015 || Haleakala || Pan-STARRS ||  || align=right | 1.6 km || 
|-id=172 bgcolor=#d6d6d6
| 581172 ||  || — || January 23, 2015 || Haleakala || Pan-STARRS ||  || align=right | 2.8 km || 
|-id=173 bgcolor=#fefefe
| 581173 ||  || — || September 18, 2009 || Kitt Peak || Spacewatch ||  || align=right data-sort-value="0.68" | 680 m || 
|-id=174 bgcolor=#d6d6d6
| 581174 ||  || — || August 14, 2012 || Kitt Peak || Spacewatch ||  || align=right | 2.4 km || 
|-id=175 bgcolor=#fefefe
| 581175 ||  || — || January 22, 2015 || Haleakala || Pan-STARRS ||  || align=right data-sort-value="0.68" | 680 m || 
|-id=176 bgcolor=#E9E9E9
| 581176 ||  || — || March 22, 2015 || Haleakala || Pan-STARRS ||  || align=right | 1.8 km || 
|-id=177 bgcolor=#d6d6d6
| 581177 ||  || — || November 5, 2007 || Mount Lemmon || Mount Lemmon Survey ||  || align=right | 2.4 km || 
|-id=178 bgcolor=#E9E9E9
| 581178 ||  || — || March 22, 2015 || Haleakala || Pan-STARRS ||  || align=right | 1.9 km || 
|-id=179 bgcolor=#d6d6d6
| 581179 ||  || — || December 18, 2009 || Kitt Peak || Spacewatch ||  || align=right | 2.5 km || 
|-id=180 bgcolor=#E9E9E9
| 581180 ||  || — || September 29, 2008 || Kitt Peak || Spacewatch ||  || align=right | 1.7 km || 
|-id=181 bgcolor=#E9E9E9
| 581181 ||  || — || November 1, 2008 || Mount Lemmon || Mount Lemmon Survey ||  || align=right | 1.9 km || 
|-id=182 bgcolor=#E9E9E9
| 581182 ||  || — || February 16, 2010 || Kitt Peak || Spacewatch ||  || align=right | 1.8 km || 
|-id=183 bgcolor=#E9E9E9
| 581183 ||  || — || October 25, 2008 || Kitt Peak || Spacewatch ||  || align=right | 1.6 km || 
|-id=184 bgcolor=#E9E9E9
| 581184 ||  || — || October 21, 2003 || Kitt Peak || Spacewatch ||  || align=right | 2.0 km || 
|-id=185 bgcolor=#E9E9E9
| 581185 ||  || — || September 6, 2008 || Mount Lemmon || Mount Lemmon Survey ||  || align=right | 1.8 km || 
|-id=186 bgcolor=#E9E9E9
| 581186 ||  || — || November 28, 2013 || Mount Lemmon || Mount Lemmon Survey ||  || align=right | 1.7 km || 
|-id=187 bgcolor=#E9E9E9
| 581187 ||  || — || February 20, 2006 || Kitt Peak || Spacewatch ||  || align=right | 2.0 km || 
|-id=188 bgcolor=#fefefe
| 581188 ||  || — || February 27, 2015 || Haleakala || Pan-STARRS ||  || align=right data-sort-value="0.62" | 620 m || 
|-id=189 bgcolor=#E9E9E9
| 581189 ||  || — || April 2, 2006 || Kitt Peak || Spacewatch ||  || align=right | 1.8 km || 
|-id=190 bgcolor=#E9E9E9
| 581190 ||  || — || March 23, 2015 || Haleakala || Pan-STARRS ||  || align=right | 1.6 km || 
|-id=191 bgcolor=#d6d6d6
| 581191 ||  || — || October 9, 2007 || Mount Lemmon || Mount Lemmon Survey ||  || align=right | 2.2 km || 
|-id=192 bgcolor=#d6d6d6
| 581192 ||  || — || February 16, 2015 || Haleakala || Pan-STARRS ||  || align=right | 1.7 km || 
|-id=193 bgcolor=#E9E9E9
| 581193 ||  || — || January 31, 2006 || Kitt Peak || Spacewatch ||  || align=right | 1.5 km || 
|-id=194 bgcolor=#E9E9E9
| 581194 ||  || — || October 21, 2003 || Kitt Peak || Spacewatch ||  || align=right | 2.0 km || 
|-id=195 bgcolor=#E9E9E9
| 581195 ||  || — || March 23, 2015 || Haleakala || Pan-STARRS ||  || align=right | 1.6 km || 
|-id=196 bgcolor=#E9E9E9
| 581196 ||  || — || October 25, 2008 || Mount Lemmon || Mount Lemmon Survey ||  || align=right | 2.1 km || 
|-id=197 bgcolor=#E9E9E9
| 581197 ||  || — || November 3, 2004 || Palomar || NEAT ||  || align=right | 1.9 km || 
|-id=198 bgcolor=#E9E9E9
| 581198 ||  || — || February 18, 2010 || Mount Lemmon || Mount Lemmon Survey ||  || align=right | 1.8 km || 
|-id=199 bgcolor=#E9E9E9
| 581199 ||  || — || October 7, 2008 || Mount Lemmon || Mount Lemmon Survey ||  || align=right | 1.6 km || 
|-id=200 bgcolor=#d6d6d6
| 581200 ||  || — || October 16, 2012 || Mount Lemmon || Mount Lemmon Survey ||  || align=right | 1.7 km || 
|}

581201–581300 

|-bgcolor=#d6d6d6
| 581201 ||  || — || March 23, 2015 || Haleakala || Pan-STARRS ||  || align=right | 2.0 km || 
|-id=202 bgcolor=#d6d6d6
| 581202 ||  || — || October 15, 2007 || Mount Lemmon || Mount Lemmon Survey || EOS || align=right | 1.8 km || 
|-id=203 bgcolor=#d6d6d6
| 581203 ||  || — || March 23, 2015 || Haleakala || Pan-STARRS ||  || align=right | 1.9 km || 
|-id=204 bgcolor=#E9E9E9
| 581204 ||  || — || April 24, 2011 || Mount Lemmon || Mount Lemmon Survey ||  || align=right | 1.6 km || 
|-id=205 bgcolor=#d6d6d6
| 581205 ||  || — || January 23, 2015 || Haleakala || Pan-STARRS ||  || align=right | 2.4 km || 
|-id=206 bgcolor=#d6d6d6
| 581206 ||  || — || March 23, 2015 || Haleakala || Pan-STARRS ||  || align=right | 1.8 km || 
|-id=207 bgcolor=#d6d6d6
| 581207 ||  || — || February 27, 2015 || Haleakala || Pan-STARRS ||  || align=right | 1.9 km || 
|-id=208 bgcolor=#fefefe
| 581208 ||  || — || March 23, 2015 || Haleakala || Pan-STARRS ||  || align=right data-sort-value="0.54" | 540 m || 
|-id=209 bgcolor=#E9E9E9
| 581209 ||  || — || October 28, 2008 || Mount Lemmon || Mount Lemmon Survey ||  || align=right | 1.6 km || 
|-id=210 bgcolor=#E9E9E9
| 581210 ||  || — || March 17, 2015 || Mount Lemmon || Mount Lemmon Survey ||  || align=right | 1.3 km || 
|-id=211 bgcolor=#E9E9E9
| 581211 ||  || — || November 21, 2009 || Mount Lemmon || Mount Lemmon Survey ||  || align=right | 1.5 km || 
|-id=212 bgcolor=#E9E9E9
| 581212 ||  || — || March 23, 2015 || Haleakala || Pan-STARRS ||  || align=right | 1.6 km || 
|-id=213 bgcolor=#d6d6d6
| 581213 ||  || — || May 7, 2006 || Mount Lemmon || Mount Lemmon Survey ||  || align=right | 1.8 km || 
|-id=214 bgcolor=#FA8072
| 581214 ||  || — || February 27, 2015 || Haleakala || Pan-STARRS ||  || align=right data-sort-value="0.71" | 710 m || 
|-id=215 bgcolor=#E9E9E9
| 581215 ||  || — || March 23, 2015 || Haleakala || Pan-STARRS ||  || align=right | 1.6 km || 
|-id=216 bgcolor=#E9E9E9
| 581216 ||  || — || March 23, 2015 || Haleakala || Pan-STARRS ||  || align=right | 1.4 km || 
|-id=217 bgcolor=#E9E9E9
| 581217 ||  || — || February 18, 2015 || Haleakala || Pan-STARRS ||  || align=right | 1.5 km || 
|-id=218 bgcolor=#d6d6d6
| 581218 ||  || — || February 18, 2015 || Haleakala || Pan-STARRS ||  || align=right | 1.7 km || 
|-id=219 bgcolor=#fefefe
| 581219 ||  || — || March 23, 2015 || Haleakala || Pan-STARRS ||  || align=right data-sort-value="0.75" | 750 m || 
|-id=220 bgcolor=#d6d6d6
| 581220 ||  || — || October 22, 2012 || Haleakala || Pan-STARRS ||  || align=right | 2.2 km || 
|-id=221 bgcolor=#E9E9E9
| 581221 ||  || — || January 27, 2015 || Haleakala || Pan-STARRS ||  || align=right | 1.7 km || 
|-id=222 bgcolor=#E9E9E9
| 581222 ||  || — || November 16, 2009 || Mount Lemmon || Mount Lemmon Survey ||  || align=right | 2.2 km || 
|-id=223 bgcolor=#E9E9E9
| 581223 ||  || — || January 21, 2015 || Haleakala || Pan-STARRS ||  || align=right | 1.7 km || 
|-id=224 bgcolor=#E9E9E9
| 581224 ||  || — || November 27, 2013 || Haleakala || Pan-STARRS ||  || align=right | 1.6 km || 
|-id=225 bgcolor=#E9E9E9
| 581225 ||  || — || February 16, 2015 || Haleakala || Pan-STARRS ||  || align=right | 1.7 km || 
|-id=226 bgcolor=#E9E9E9
| 581226 ||  || — || November 29, 2013 || Mount Lemmon || Mount Lemmon Survey ||  || align=right | 1.9 km || 
|-id=227 bgcolor=#E9E9E9
| 581227 ||  || — || October 3, 2008 || Kitt Peak || Spacewatch ||  || align=right | 1.9 km || 
|-id=228 bgcolor=#E9E9E9
| 581228 ||  || — || October 1, 2013 || Kitt Peak || Spacewatch || NEM || align=right | 2.0 km || 
|-id=229 bgcolor=#E9E9E9
| 581229 ||  || — || April 7, 2006 || Kitt Peak || Spacewatch ||  || align=right | 1.8 km || 
|-id=230 bgcolor=#E9E9E9
| 581230 ||  || — || November 1, 2013 || Kitt Peak || Spacewatch ||  || align=right | 2.1 km || 
|-id=231 bgcolor=#fefefe
| 581231 ||  || — || May 3, 2008 || Mount Lemmon || Mount Lemmon Survey ||  || align=right data-sort-value="0.73" | 730 m || 
|-id=232 bgcolor=#E9E9E9
| 581232 ||  || — || September 27, 2009 || Kitt Peak || Spacewatch ||  || align=right | 1.4 km || 
|-id=233 bgcolor=#E9E9E9
| 581233 ||  || — || October 2, 2008 || Mount Lemmon || Mount Lemmon Survey ||  || align=right | 1.8 km || 
|-id=234 bgcolor=#d6d6d6
| 581234 ||  || — || November 23, 2008 || Kitt Peak || Spacewatch ||  || align=right | 1.9 km || 
|-id=235 bgcolor=#E9E9E9
| 581235 ||  || — || November 27, 2013 || Haleakala || Pan-STARRS ||  || align=right | 1.7 km || 
|-id=236 bgcolor=#d6d6d6
| 581236 ||  || — || November 19, 2008 || Kitt Peak || Spacewatch ||  || align=right | 2.1 km || 
|-id=237 bgcolor=#E9E9E9
| 581237 ||  || — || October 25, 2008 || Mount Lemmon || Mount Lemmon Survey ||  || align=right | 2.0 km || 
|-id=238 bgcolor=#E9E9E9
| 581238 ||  || — || July 12, 2005 || Mount Lemmon || Mount Lemmon Survey ||  || align=right data-sort-value="0.93" | 930 m || 
|-id=239 bgcolor=#E9E9E9
| 581239 ||  || — || October 28, 2013 || Kitt Peak || Spacewatch ||  || align=right | 1.7 km || 
|-id=240 bgcolor=#E9E9E9
| 581240 ||  || — || January 28, 2015 || Haleakala || Pan-STARRS ||  || align=right | 2.2 km || 
|-id=241 bgcolor=#E9E9E9
| 581241 ||  || — || November 27, 2013 || Haleakala || Pan-STARRS ||  || align=right | 1.8 km || 
|-id=242 bgcolor=#E9E9E9
| 581242 ||  || — || February 14, 2010 || Mount Lemmon || Mount Lemmon Survey ||  || align=right | 2.1 km || 
|-id=243 bgcolor=#E9E9E9
| 581243 ||  || — || March 5, 2002 || Kitt Peak || Spacewatch ||  || align=right | 1.6 km || 
|-id=244 bgcolor=#d6d6d6
| 581244 ||  || — || February 5, 2009 || Kitt Peak || Spacewatch ||  || align=right | 2.5 km || 
|-id=245 bgcolor=#E9E9E9
| 581245 ||  || — || April 6, 2011 || Mount Lemmon || Mount Lemmon Survey ||  || align=right | 2.1 km || 
|-id=246 bgcolor=#E9E9E9
| 581246 ||  || — || February 18, 2015 || Haleakala || Pan-STARRS ||  || align=right | 1.8 km || 
|-id=247 bgcolor=#E9E9E9
| 581247 ||  || — || November 20, 1995 || Kitt Peak || Spacewatch ||  || align=right | 2.2 km || 
|-id=248 bgcolor=#E9E9E9
| 581248 ||  || — || November 8, 2008 || Kitt Peak || Spacewatch ||  || align=right | 2.0 km || 
|-id=249 bgcolor=#E9E9E9
| 581249 ||  || — || September 19, 2003 || Palomar || NEAT ||  || align=right | 2.6 km || 
|-id=250 bgcolor=#E9E9E9
| 581250 ||  || — || February 19, 2015 || Haleakala || Pan-STARRS ||  || align=right | 1.5 km || 
|-id=251 bgcolor=#E9E9E9
| 581251 ||  || — || November 27, 2013 || Haleakala || Pan-STARRS ||  || align=right | 1.7 km || 
|-id=252 bgcolor=#d6d6d6
| 581252 ||  || — || September 12, 2007 || Mount Lemmon || Mount Lemmon Survey ||  || align=right | 2.1 km || 
|-id=253 bgcolor=#E9E9E9
| 581253 ||  || — || January 28, 2015 || Haleakala || Pan-STARRS ||  || align=right | 2.4 km || 
|-id=254 bgcolor=#d6d6d6
| 581254 ||  || — || December 29, 2014 || Haleakala || Pan-STARRS ||  || align=right | 2.6 km || 
|-id=255 bgcolor=#E9E9E9
| 581255 ||  || — || August 12, 2013 || Kitt Peak || Spacewatch ||  || align=right | 1.6 km || 
|-id=256 bgcolor=#E9E9E9
| 581256 ||  || — || December 16, 2009 || Mount Lemmon || Mount Lemmon Survey ||  || align=right | 2.2 km || 
|-id=257 bgcolor=#d6d6d6
| 581257 ||  || — || March 28, 2015 || Haleakala || Pan-STARRS ||  || align=right | 2.7 km || 
|-id=258 bgcolor=#E9E9E9
| 581258 ||  || — || March 2, 2006 || Kitt Peak || Spacewatch ||  || align=right | 1.0 km || 
|-id=259 bgcolor=#d6d6d6
| 581259 ||  || — || November 19, 2006 || Catalina || CSS ||  || align=right | 3.3 km || 
|-id=260 bgcolor=#d6d6d6
| 581260 ||  || — || September 4, 2011 || Haleakala || Pan-STARRS ||  || align=right | 2.8 km || 
|-id=261 bgcolor=#d6d6d6
| 581261 ||  || — || March 28, 2015 || Haleakala || Pan-STARRS ||  || align=right | 2.4 km || 
|-id=262 bgcolor=#d6d6d6
| 581262 ||  || — || October 26, 2011 || Haleakala || Pan-STARRS ||  || align=right | 2.8 km || 
|-id=263 bgcolor=#d6d6d6
| 581263 ||  || — || July 4, 2005 || Mount Lemmon || Mount Lemmon Survey || EOS || align=right | 2.6 km || 
|-id=264 bgcolor=#d6d6d6
| 581264 ||  || — || December 30, 2013 || Kitt Peak || Spacewatch ||  || align=right | 2.3 km || 
|-id=265 bgcolor=#E9E9E9
| 581265 ||  || — || May 26, 2011 || Kitt Peak || Spacewatch ||  || align=right | 1.9 km || 
|-id=266 bgcolor=#E9E9E9
| 581266 ||  || — || September 23, 2008 || Mount Lemmon || Mount Lemmon Survey ||  || align=right | 2.0 km || 
|-id=267 bgcolor=#E9E9E9
| 581267 ||  || — || February 27, 2015 || Haleakala || Pan-STARRS ||  || align=right | 2.0 km || 
|-id=268 bgcolor=#d6d6d6
| 581268 ||  || — || January 1, 2014 || Mount Lemmon || Mount Lemmon Survey ||  || align=right | 2.4 km || 
|-id=269 bgcolor=#d6d6d6
| 581269 ||  || — || April 14, 2005 || Kitt Peak || Spacewatch ||  || align=right | 2.3 km || 
|-id=270 bgcolor=#fefefe
| 581270 ||  || — || August 18, 2009 || Kitt Peak || Spacewatch ||  || align=right data-sort-value="0.70" | 700 m || 
|-id=271 bgcolor=#d6d6d6
| 581271 ||  || — || March 25, 2015 || Haleakala || Pan-STARRS ||  || align=right | 2.5 km || 
|-id=272 bgcolor=#E9E9E9
| 581272 ||  || — || November 20, 2009 || Kitt Peak || Spacewatch ||  || align=right | 2.1 km || 
|-id=273 bgcolor=#fefefe
| 581273 ||  || — || April 30, 2004 || Kitt Peak || Spacewatch ||  || align=right data-sort-value="0.86" | 860 m || 
|-id=274 bgcolor=#E9E9E9
| 581274 ||  || — || April 9, 2003 || Palomar || NEAT ||  || align=right data-sort-value="0.86" | 860 m || 
|-id=275 bgcolor=#E9E9E9
| 581275 ||  || — || October 8, 2008 || Catalina || CSS ||  || align=right | 2.0 km || 
|-id=276 bgcolor=#E9E9E9
| 581276 ||  || — || October 24, 2013 || Mount Lemmon || Mount Lemmon Survey ||  || align=right | 1.5 km || 
|-id=277 bgcolor=#E9E9E9
| 581277 ||  || — || October 22, 2003 || Apache Point || SDSS Collaboration ||  || align=right | 2.5 km || 
|-id=278 bgcolor=#d6d6d6
| 581278 ||  || — || January 1, 2009 || Kitt Peak || Spacewatch ||  || align=right | 2.9 km || 
|-id=279 bgcolor=#d6d6d6
| 581279 ||  || — || March 25, 2015 || Haleakala || Pan-STARRS ||  || align=right | 2.2 km || 
|-id=280 bgcolor=#fefefe
| 581280 ||  || — || January 30, 2011 || Mount Lemmon || Mount Lemmon Survey ||  || align=right data-sort-value="0.90" | 900 m || 
|-id=281 bgcolor=#d6d6d6
| 581281 ||  || — || March 25, 2015 || Haleakala || Pan-STARRS ||  || align=right | 2.3 km || 
|-id=282 bgcolor=#d6d6d6
| 581282 ||  || — || March 25, 2015 || Haleakala || Pan-STARRS ||  || align=right | 2.5 km || 
|-id=283 bgcolor=#E9E9E9
| 581283 ||  || — || September 24, 2009 || Catalina || CSS ||  || align=right data-sort-value="0.96" | 960 m || 
|-id=284 bgcolor=#E9E9E9
| 581284 ||  || — || February 16, 2002 || Palomar || NEAT || EUN || align=right | 1.5 km || 
|-id=285 bgcolor=#d6d6d6
| 581285 ||  || — || March 9, 2005 || Catalina || CSS ||  || align=right | 2.7 km || 
|-id=286 bgcolor=#d6d6d6
| 581286 ||  || — || October 18, 2012 || Haleakala || Pan-STARRS ||  || align=right | 1.8 km || 
|-id=287 bgcolor=#C2FFFF
| 581287 ||  || — || November 8, 2010 || Kitt Peak || Spacewatch || L4 || align=right | 8.2 km || 
|-id=288 bgcolor=#E9E9E9
| 581288 ||  || — || March 25, 2015 || Haleakala || Pan-STARRS ||  || align=right | 1.8 km || 
|-id=289 bgcolor=#d6d6d6
| 581289 ||  || — || October 21, 2012 || Haleakala || Pan-STARRS ||  || align=right | 2.1 km || 
|-id=290 bgcolor=#d6d6d6
| 581290 ||  || — || March 28, 2015 || Haleakala || Pan-STARRS ||  || align=right | 2.2 km || 
|-id=291 bgcolor=#fefefe
| 581291 ||  || — || April 26, 2008 || Mount Lemmon || Mount Lemmon Survey ||  || align=right data-sort-value="0.75" | 750 m || 
|-id=292 bgcolor=#d6d6d6
| 581292 ||  || — || March 30, 2015 || Haleakala || Pan-STARRS ||  || align=right | 2.3 km || 
|-id=293 bgcolor=#d6d6d6
| 581293 ||  || — || March 30, 2015 || Haleakala || Pan-STARRS ||  || align=right | 1.9 km || 
|-id=294 bgcolor=#d6d6d6
| 581294 ||  || — || December 29, 2014 || Haleakala || Pan-STARRS ||  || align=right | 2.7 km || 
|-id=295 bgcolor=#E9E9E9
| 581295 ||  || — || November 21, 2009 || Mount Lemmon || Mount Lemmon Survey ||  || align=right | 1.8 km || 
|-id=296 bgcolor=#d6d6d6
| 581296 ||  || — || November 28, 2013 || Mount Lemmon || Mount Lemmon Survey ||  || align=right | 2.4 km || 
|-id=297 bgcolor=#fefefe
| 581297 ||  || — || March 28, 2015 || Haleakala || Pan-STARRS || H || align=right data-sort-value="0.53" | 530 m || 
|-id=298 bgcolor=#E9E9E9
| 581298 ||  || — || April 26, 2006 || Kitt Peak || Spacewatch ||  || align=right | 2.3 km || 
|-id=299 bgcolor=#d6d6d6
| 581299 ||  || — || January 19, 2015 || Haleakala || Pan-STARRS ||  || align=right | 2.3 km || 
|-id=300 bgcolor=#E9E9E9
| 581300 ||  || — || April 13, 2011 || Kitt Peak || Spacewatch ||  || align=right | 2.1 km || 
|}

581301–581400 

|-bgcolor=#E9E9E9
| 581301 ||  || — || March 27, 2011 || Mount Lemmon || Mount Lemmon Survey ||  || align=right | 2.5 km || 
|-id=302 bgcolor=#E9E9E9
| 581302 ||  || — || September 18, 2007 || Kitt Peak || Spacewatch ||  || align=right | 1.8 km || 
|-id=303 bgcolor=#d6d6d6
| 581303 ||  || — || March 13, 2004 || Palomar || NEAT ||  || align=right | 3.1 km || 
|-id=304 bgcolor=#fefefe
| 581304 ||  || — || September 14, 2005 || Kitt Peak || Spacewatch ||  || align=right data-sort-value="0.71" | 710 m || 
|-id=305 bgcolor=#d6d6d6
| 581305 ||  || — || October 8, 2007 || Mount Lemmon || Mount Lemmon Survey ||  || align=right | 2.1 km || 
|-id=306 bgcolor=#E9E9E9
| 581306 ||  || — || December 20, 2004 || Mount Lemmon || Mount Lemmon Survey ||  || align=right | 2.3 km || 
|-id=307 bgcolor=#d6d6d6
| 581307 ||  || — || October 21, 2011 || Kitt Peak || Spacewatch ||  || align=right | 2.8 km || 
|-id=308 bgcolor=#d6d6d6
| 581308 ||  || — || January 28, 2015 || Haleakala || Pan-STARRS ||  || align=right | 2.7 km || 
|-id=309 bgcolor=#E9E9E9
| 581309 ||  || — || March 13, 2011 || Kitt Peak || Spacewatch ||  || align=right | 1.6 km || 
|-id=310 bgcolor=#E9E9E9
| 581310 ||  || — || November 29, 2013 || Mount Lemmon || Mount Lemmon Survey ||  || align=right | 1.7 km || 
|-id=311 bgcolor=#d6d6d6
| 581311 ||  || — || September 15, 2012 || Mount Lemmon || Mount Lemmon Survey ||  || align=right | 2.6 km || 
|-id=312 bgcolor=#E9E9E9
| 581312 ||  || — || October 1, 2003 || Kitt Peak || Spacewatch ||  || align=right | 2.1 km || 
|-id=313 bgcolor=#d6d6d6
| 581313 ||  || — || November 2, 2013 || Mount Lemmon || Mount Lemmon Survey ||  || align=right | 2.2 km || 
|-id=314 bgcolor=#E9E9E9
| 581314 ||  || — || January 20, 2015 || Haleakala || Pan-STARRS ||  || align=right | 1.3 km || 
|-id=315 bgcolor=#E9E9E9
| 581315 ||  || — || September 20, 2003 || Kitt Peak || Spacewatch ||  || align=right | 2.2 km || 
|-id=316 bgcolor=#d6d6d6
| 581316 ||  || — || April 12, 2010 || Mount Lemmon || Mount Lemmon Survey ||  || align=right | 1.7 km || 
|-id=317 bgcolor=#E9E9E9
| 581317 ||  || — || October 27, 2009 || Mount Lemmon || Mount Lemmon Survey ||  || align=right | 1.3 km || 
|-id=318 bgcolor=#d6d6d6
| 581318 ||  || — || November 14, 2013 || Mount Lemmon || Mount Lemmon Survey ||  || align=right | 1.8 km || 
|-id=319 bgcolor=#E9E9E9
| 581319 ||  || — || October 8, 2008 || Mount Lemmon || Mount Lemmon Survey ||  || align=right | 1.8 km || 
|-id=320 bgcolor=#d6d6d6
| 581320 ||  || — || November 26, 2013 || Mount Lemmon || Mount Lemmon Survey ||  || align=right | 2.5 km || 
|-id=321 bgcolor=#E9E9E9
| 581321 ||  || — || August 25, 2004 || Kitt Peak || Spacewatch ||  || align=right | 1.4 km || 
|-id=322 bgcolor=#d6d6d6
| 581322 ||  || — || February 20, 2015 || Haleakala || Pan-STARRS ||  || align=right | 2.4 km || 
|-id=323 bgcolor=#E9E9E9
| 581323 ||  || — || December 1, 2005 || Kitt Peak || L. H. Wasserman, R. Millis ||  || align=right | 1.1 km || 
|-id=324 bgcolor=#E9E9E9
| 581324 ||  || — || August 24, 2012 || Kitt Peak || Spacewatch ||  || align=right | 1.8 km || 
|-id=325 bgcolor=#E9E9E9
| 581325 ||  || — || September 16, 2012 || Catalina || CSS ||  || align=right | 2.5 km || 
|-id=326 bgcolor=#E9E9E9
| 581326 ||  || — || October 20, 2008 || Mount Lemmon || Mount Lemmon Survey ||  || align=right | 2.0 km || 
|-id=327 bgcolor=#E9E9E9
| 581327 ||  || — || November 2, 2013 || Mount Lemmon || Mount Lemmon Survey ||  || align=right | 1.3 km || 
|-id=328 bgcolor=#d6d6d6
| 581328 ||  || — || March 15, 2004 || Kitt Peak || Spacewatch || EOS || align=right | 1.7 km || 
|-id=329 bgcolor=#d6d6d6
| 581329 ||  || — || December 11, 2013 || Haleakala || Pan-STARRS ||  || align=right | 2.8 km || 
|-id=330 bgcolor=#C2FFFF
| 581330 ||  || — || July 29, 2008 || Kitt Peak || Spacewatch || L4 || align=right | 8.2 km || 
|-id=331 bgcolor=#d6d6d6
| 581331 ||  || — || January 20, 2015 || Haleakala || Pan-STARRS ||  || align=right | 2.4 km || 
|-id=332 bgcolor=#d6d6d6
| 581332 ||  || — || March 20, 2015 || Haleakala || Pan-STARRS ||  || align=right | 1.9 km || 
|-id=333 bgcolor=#fefefe
| 581333 ||  || — || March 19, 2015 || Haleakala || Pan-STARRS || H || align=right data-sort-value="0.60" | 600 m || 
|-id=334 bgcolor=#fefefe
| 581334 ||  || — || March 31, 2015 || Haleakala || Pan-STARRS ||  || align=right data-sort-value="0.60" | 600 m || 
|-id=335 bgcolor=#d6d6d6
| 581335 ||  || — || March 21, 2015 || Haleakala || Pan-STARRS ||  || align=right | 2.2 km || 
|-id=336 bgcolor=#E9E9E9
| 581336 ||  || — || March 28, 2015 || Haleakala || Pan-STARRS ||  || align=right | 1.1 km || 
|-id=337 bgcolor=#E9E9E9
| 581337 ||  || — || March 30, 2015 || Haleakala || Pan-STARRS ||  || align=right | 1.2 km || 
|-id=338 bgcolor=#d6d6d6
| 581338 ||  || — || March 28, 2015 || Haleakala || Pan-STARRS ||  || align=right | 2.0 km || 
|-id=339 bgcolor=#E9E9E9
| 581339 ||  || — || March 29, 2015 || Kitt Peak || Spacewatch ||  || align=right | 1.3 km || 
|-id=340 bgcolor=#fefefe
| 581340 ||  || — || March 26, 2004 || Kitt Peak || Spacewatch ||  || align=right data-sort-value="0.71" | 710 m || 
|-id=341 bgcolor=#d6d6d6
| 581341 ||  || — || March 19, 2015 || Haleakala || Pan-STARRS ||  || align=right | 1.9 km || 
|-id=342 bgcolor=#E9E9E9
| 581342 ||  || — || March 18, 2010 || Mount Lemmon || Mount Lemmon Survey ||  || align=right | 1.5 km || 
|-id=343 bgcolor=#d6d6d6
| 581343 ||  || — || November 14, 2012 || Mauna Kea || M. Micheli, A. Draginda ||  || align=right | 2.3 km || 
|-id=344 bgcolor=#d6d6d6
| 581344 ||  || — || March 23, 2015 || Mount Lemmon || Mount Lemmon Survey ||  || align=right | 1.8 km || 
|-id=345 bgcolor=#d6d6d6
| 581345 ||  || — || March 19, 2010 || Mount Lemmon || Mount Lemmon Survey ||  || align=right | 1.7 km || 
|-id=346 bgcolor=#d6d6d6
| 581346 ||  || — || January 25, 2015 || Haleakala || Pan-STARRS ||  || align=right | 2.4 km || 
|-id=347 bgcolor=#d6d6d6
| 581347 ||  || — || November 13, 2012 || ESA OGS || ESA OGS ||  || align=right | 4.0 km || 
|-id=348 bgcolor=#d6d6d6
| 581348 ||  || — || March 25, 2015 || Haleakala || Pan-STARRS ||  || align=right | 2.4 km || 
|-id=349 bgcolor=#d6d6d6
| 581349 ||  || — || March 25, 2015 || Haleakala || Pan-STARRS ||  || align=right | 2.0 km || 
|-id=350 bgcolor=#d6d6d6
| 581350 ||  || — || March 28, 2015 || Haleakala || Pan-STARRS ||  || align=right | 2.1 km || 
|-id=351 bgcolor=#d6d6d6
| 581351 ||  || — || March 29, 2015 || Haleakala || Pan-STARRS ||  || align=right | 2.6 km || 
|-id=352 bgcolor=#E9E9E9
| 581352 ||  || — || March 31, 2015 || Haleakala || Pan-STARRS ||  || align=right data-sort-value="0.71" | 710 m || 
|-id=353 bgcolor=#E9E9E9
| 581353 ||  || — || March 30, 2015 || Haleakala || Pan-STARRS ||  || align=right data-sort-value="0.82" | 820 m || 
|-id=354 bgcolor=#d6d6d6
| 581354 ||  || — || March 21, 2015 || Haleakala || Pan-STARRS ||  || align=right | 2.3 km || 
|-id=355 bgcolor=#E9E9E9
| 581355 ||  || — || July 31, 2016 || Haleakala || Pan-STARRS ||  || align=right | 1.9 km || 
|-id=356 bgcolor=#d6d6d6
| 581356 ||  || — || March 18, 2015 || Haleakala || Pan-STARRS ||  || align=right | 2.2 km || 
|-id=357 bgcolor=#d6d6d6
| 581357 ||  || — || July 12, 2005 || Mount Lemmon || Mount Lemmon Survey ||  || align=right | 2.7 km || 
|-id=358 bgcolor=#fefefe
| 581358 ||  || — || March 25, 2015 || Haleakala || Pan-STARRS ||  || align=right data-sort-value="0.78" | 780 m || 
|-id=359 bgcolor=#d6d6d6
| 581359 ||  || — || March 26, 2015 || Mount Lemmon || Mount Lemmon Survey ||  || align=right | 2.8 km || 
|-id=360 bgcolor=#d6d6d6
| 581360 ||  || — || March 28, 2015 || Haleakala || Pan-STARRS ||  || align=right | 2.1 km || 
|-id=361 bgcolor=#E9E9E9
| 581361 ||  || — || March 17, 2015 || Mount Lemmon || Mount Lemmon Survey ||  || align=right | 1.8 km || 
|-id=362 bgcolor=#E9E9E9
| 581362 ||  || — || March 18, 2015 || Haleakala || Pan-STARRS ||  || align=right | 1.3 km || 
|-id=363 bgcolor=#E9E9E9
| 581363 ||  || — || March 22, 2015 || Haleakala || Pan-STARRS ||  || align=right | 2.0 km || 
|-id=364 bgcolor=#d6d6d6
| 581364 ||  || — || March 21, 2015 || Haleakala || Pan-STARRS ||  || align=right | 1.7 km || 
|-id=365 bgcolor=#E9E9E9
| 581365 ||  || — || March 23, 2015 || Haleakala || Pan-STARRS ||  || align=right | 1.6 km || 
|-id=366 bgcolor=#d6d6d6
| 581366 ||  || — || March 29, 2015 || Kitt Peak || Spacewatch ||  || align=right | 2.0 km || 
|-id=367 bgcolor=#d6d6d6
| 581367 ||  || — || March 24, 2015 || Haleakala || Pan-STARRS ||  || align=right | 2.0 km || 
|-id=368 bgcolor=#d6d6d6
| 581368 ||  || — || March 30, 2015 || Haleakala || Pan-STARRS ||  || align=right | 1.8 km || 
|-id=369 bgcolor=#d6d6d6
| 581369 ||  || — || March 17, 2015 || Haleakala || Pan-STARRS ||  || align=right | 1.7 km || 
|-id=370 bgcolor=#C2FFFF
| 581370 ||  || — || March 21, 2015 || Haleakala || Pan-STARRS || L4 || align=right | 6.1 km || 
|-id=371 bgcolor=#E9E9E9
| 581371 ||  || — || March 26, 2001 || Kitt Peak || M. W. Buie, S. D. Kern ||  || align=right | 1.6 km || 
|-id=372 bgcolor=#E9E9E9
| 581372 ||  || — || March 31, 2015 || Haleakala || Pan-STARRS ||  || align=right data-sort-value="0.86" | 860 m || 
|-id=373 bgcolor=#E9E9E9
| 581373 ||  || — || September 29, 2008 || Kitt Peak || Spacewatch ||  || align=right | 1.5 km || 
|-id=374 bgcolor=#d6d6d6
| 581374 ||  || — || January 20, 2015 || Haleakala || Pan-STARRS ||  || align=right | 2.4 km || 
|-id=375 bgcolor=#fefefe
| 581375 ||  || — || September 5, 2008 || Kitt Peak || Spacewatch || H || align=right data-sort-value="0.61" | 610 m || 
|-id=376 bgcolor=#d6d6d6
| 581376 ||  || — || September 17, 2013 || Mount Lemmon || Mount Lemmon Survey ||  || align=right | 2.4 km || 
|-id=377 bgcolor=#fefefe
| 581377 ||  || — || February 5, 2011 || Haleakala || Pan-STARRS ||  || align=right data-sort-value="0.75" | 750 m || 
|-id=378 bgcolor=#fefefe
| 581378 ||  || — || October 27, 2006 || Mount Lemmon || Mount Lemmon Survey ||  || align=right data-sort-value="0.57" | 570 m || 
|-id=379 bgcolor=#d6d6d6
| 581379 ||  || — || October 11, 2007 || Mount Lemmon || Mount Lemmon Survey ||  || align=right | 2.6 km || 
|-id=380 bgcolor=#d6d6d6
| 581380 ||  || — || October 11, 2012 || Haleakala || Pan-STARRS ||  || align=right | 1.9 km || 
|-id=381 bgcolor=#fefefe
| 581381 ||  || — || September 24, 2000 || Uppsala-Kvistaberg || Kvistaberg Obs. || H || align=right data-sort-value="0.79" | 790 m || 
|-id=382 bgcolor=#E9E9E9
| 581382 ||  || — || April 2, 2011 || Kitt Peak || Spacewatch ||  || align=right | 1.8 km || 
|-id=383 bgcolor=#d6d6d6
| 581383 ||  || — || October 28, 2008 || Kitt Peak || Spacewatch ||  || align=right | 2.4 km || 
|-id=384 bgcolor=#E9E9E9
| 581384 ||  || — || September 22, 2008 || Catalina || CSS ||  || align=right | 2.4 km || 
|-id=385 bgcolor=#d6d6d6
| 581385 ||  || — || November 3, 2008 || Mount Lemmon || Mount Lemmon Survey ||  || align=right | 2.2 km || 
|-id=386 bgcolor=#E9E9E9
| 581386 ||  || — || February 18, 2015 || Haleakala || Pan-STARRS ||  || align=right | 1.4 km || 
|-id=387 bgcolor=#E9E9E9
| 581387 ||  || — || February 7, 2006 || Catalina || CSS ||  || align=right | 2.1 km || 
|-id=388 bgcolor=#E9E9E9
| 581388 ||  || — || December 29, 2014 || Haleakala || Pan-STARRS ||  || align=right | 1.8 km || 
|-id=389 bgcolor=#E9E9E9
| 581389 ||  || — || October 1, 2003 || Kitt Peak || Spacewatch ||  || align=right | 2.7 km || 
|-id=390 bgcolor=#E9E9E9
| 581390 ||  || — || September 10, 2007 || Kitt Peak || Spacewatch ||  || align=right | 1.8 km || 
|-id=391 bgcolor=#d6d6d6
| 581391 ||  || — || February 26, 2004 || Kitt Peak || M. W. Buie, D. E. Trilling ||  || align=right | 2.0 km || 
|-id=392 bgcolor=#d6d6d6
| 581392 ||  || — || October 7, 2008 || Mount Lemmon || Mount Lemmon Survey ||  || align=right | 2.0 km || 
|-id=393 bgcolor=#d6d6d6
| 581393 ||  || — || January 25, 2015 || Haleakala || Pan-STARRS ||  || align=right | 2.1 km || 
|-id=394 bgcolor=#d6d6d6
| 581394 ||  || — || March 30, 2015 || Haleakala || Pan-STARRS ||  || align=right | 2.2 km || 
|-id=395 bgcolor=#d6d6d6
| 581395 ||  || — || March 28, 2015 || Haleakala || Pan-STARRS ||  || align=right | 2.7 km || 
|-id=396 bgcolor=#d6d6d6
| 581396 ||  || — || March 29, 2015 || Haleakala || Pan-STARRS ||  || align=right | 2.1 km || 
|-id=397 bgcolor=#d6d6d6
| 581397 ||  || — || January 25, 2014 || Haleakala || Pan-STARRS ||  || align=right | 2.3 km || 
|-id=398 bgcolor=#d6d6d6
| 581398 ||  || — || January 28, 2015 || Haleakala || Pan-STARRS ||  || align=right | 3.2 km || 
|-id=399 bgcolor=#d6d6d6
| 581399 ||  || — || October 12, 2006 || Palomar || NEAT ||  || align=right | 3.9 km || 
|-id=400 bgcolor=#d6d6d6
| 581400 ||  || — || March 1, 2009 || Kitt Peak || Spacewatch ||  || align=right | 2.4 km || 
|}

581401–581500 

|-bgcolor=#E9E9E9
| 581401 ||  || — || September 21, 2003 || Kitt Peak || Spacewatch ||  || align=right | 2.2 km || 
|-id=402 bgcolor=#d6d6d6
| 581402 ||  || — || August 31, 2002 || Kitt Peak || Spacewatch ||  || align=right | 2.0 km || 
|-id=403 bgcolor=#d6d6d6
| 581403 ||  || — || September 17, 2012 || Kitt Peak || Spacewatch ||  || align=right | 3.2 km || 
|-id=404 bgcolor=#E9E9E9
| 581404 ||  || — || November 10, 2013 || Kitt Peak || Spacewatch ||  || align=right | 1.1 km || 
|-id=405 bgcolor=#E9E9E9
| 581405 ||  || — || January 24, 2014 || Haleakala || Pan-STARRS ||  || align=right | 2.5 km || 
|-id=406 bgcolor=#d6d6d6
| 581406 ||  || — || March 21, 2015 || Haleakala || Pan-STARRS ||  || align=right | 2.5 km || 
|-id=407 bgcolor=#FA8072
| 581407 ||  || — || October 3, 2006 || Mount Lemmon || Mount Lemmon Survey ||  || align=right data-sort-value="0.57" | 570 m || 
|-id=408 bgcolor=#d6d6d6
| 581408 ||  || — || March 25, 2015 || Haleakala || Pan-STARRS ||  || align=right | 2.1 km || 
|-id=409 bgcolor=#d6d6d6
| 581409 ||  || — || March 27, 2015 || Haleakala || Pan-STARRS ||  || align=right | 2.3 km || 
|-id=410 bgcolor=#d6d6d6
| 581410 ||  || — || March 22, 2015 || Haleakala || Pan-STARRS ||  || align=right | 1.5 km || 
|-id=411 bgcolor=#d6d6d6
| 581411 ||  || — || January 3, 2014 || Mount Lemmon || Mount Lemmon Survey ||  || align=right | 2.0 km || 
|-id=412 bgcolor=#E9E9E9
| 581412 ||  || — || August 15, 2002 || Kitt Peak || Spacewatch ||  || align=right | 2.5 km || 
|-id=413 bgcolor=#E9E9E9
| 581413 ||  || — || April 25, 2007 || Mount Lemmon || Mount Lemmon Survey ||  || align=right data-sort-value="0.94" | 940 m || 
|-id=414 bgcolor=#d6d6d6
| 581414 ||  || — || March 27, 2015 || Haleakala || Pan-STARRS ||  || align=right | 2.0 km || 
|-id=415 bgcolor=#fefefe
| 581415 ||  || — || February 25, 2011 || Kitt Peak || Spacewatch ||  || align=right data-sort-value="0.74" | 740 m || 
|-id=416 bgcolor=#d6d6d6
| 581416 ||  || — || December 22, 2008 || Kitt Peak || Spacewatch ||  || align=right | 2.5 km || 
|-id=417 bgcolor=#d6d6d6
| 581417 ||  || — || January 2, 2014 || Kitt Peak || Spacewatch ||  || align=right | 2.5 km || 
|-id=418 bgcolor=#fefefe
| 581418 ||  || — || February 11, 2011 || Mount Lemmon || Mount Lemmon Survey ||  || align=right data-sort-value="0.75" | 750 m || 
|-id=419 bgcolor=#d6d6d6
| 581419 ||  || — || October 10, 2012 || Mount Lemmon || Mount Lemmon Survey ||  || align=right | 2.1 km || 
|-id=420 bgcolor=#d6d6d6
| 581420 ||  || — || November 7, 2012 || Mount Lemmon || Mount Lemmon Survey ||  || align=right | 2.5 km || 
|-id=421 bgcolor=#d6d6d6
| 581421 ||  || — || April 13, 2015 || Haleakala || Pan-STARRS ||  || align=right | 1.8 km || 
|-id=422 bgcolor=#d6d6d6
| 581422 ||  || — || April 4, 2015 || Haleakala || Pan-STARRS ||  || align=right | 2.7 km || 
|-id=423 bgcolor=#fefefe
| 581423 ||  || — || April 14, 2015 || Mount Lemmon || Mount Lemmon Survey || H || align=right data-sort-value="0.51" | 510 m || 
|-id=424 bgcolor=#d6d6d6
| 581424 ||  || — || October 25, 2012 || Kitt Peak || Spacewatch ||  || align=right | 1.9 km || 
|-id=425 bgcolor=#E9E9E9
| 581425 ||  || — || April 11, 2015 || Mount Lemmon || Mount Lemmon Survey ||  || align=right | 1.7 km || 
|-id=426 bgcolor=#E9E9E9
| 581426 ||  || — || November 9, 2009 || Kitt Peak || Spacewatch ||  || align=right | 2.0 km || 
|-id=427 bgcolor=#d6d6d6
| 581427 ||  || — || March 20, 2015 || Haleakala || Pan-STARRS ||  || align=right | 2.0 km || 
|-id=428 bgcolor=#d6d6d6
| 581428 ||  || — || January 20, 2015 || Haleakala || Pan-STARRS ||  || align=right | 2.7 km || 
|-id=429 bgcolor=#d6d6d6
| 581429 ||  || — || January 12, 2008 || Mount Lemmon || Mount Lemmon Survey ||  || align=right | 3.9 km || 
|-id=430 bgcolor=#d6d6d6
| 581430 ||  || — || November 1, 2007 || Kitt Peak || Spacewatch ||  || align=right | 2.4 km || 
|-id=431 bgcolor=#E9E9E9
| 581431 ||  || — || December 24, 2013 || Mount Lemmon || Mount Lemmon Survey ||  || align=right | 1.5 km || 
|-id=432 bgcolor=#d6d6d6
| 581432 ||  || — || January 1, 2009 || Kitt Peak || Spacewatch ||  || align=right | 2.7 km || 
|-id=433 bgcolor=#d6d6d6
| 581433 ||  || — || August 28, 2006 || Kitt Peak || Spacewatch ||  || align=right | 2.9 km || 
|-id=434 bgcolor=#fefefe
| 581434 ||  || — || September 23, 2008 || Kitt Peak || Spacewatch || H || align=right data-sort-value="0.65" | 650 m || 
|-id=435 bgcolor=#fefefe
| 581435 ||  || — || February 7, 2011 || Mount Lemmon || Mount Lemmon Survey ||  || align=right data-sort-value="0.63" | 630 m || 
|-id=436 bgcolor=#E9E9E9
| 581436 ||  || — || January 21, 2015 || Haleakala || Pan-STARRS ||  || align=right | 2.5 km || 
|-id=437 bgcolor=#E9E9E9
| 581437 ||  || — || October 15, 2012 || Haleakala || Pan-STARRS ||  || align=right | 2.3 km || 
|-id=438 bgcolor=#fefefe
| 581438 ||  || — || February 2, 2012 || Catalina || CSS || H || align=right data-sort-value="0.76" | 760 m || 
|-id=439 bgcolor=#E9E9E9
| 581439 ||  || — || March 3, 2006 || Kitt Peak || Spacewatch ||  || align=right | 1.2 km || 
|-id=440 bgcolor=#d6d6d6
| 581440 ||  || — || March 22, 2015 || Haleakala || Pan-STARRS ||  || align=right | 1.9 km || 
|-id=441 bgcolor=#d6d6d6
| 581441 ||  || — || March 29, 2015 || Haleakala || Pan-STARRS ||  || align=right | 2.3 km || 
|-id=442 bgcolor=#d6d6d6
| 581442 ||  || — || March 21, 2015 || Mount Lemmon || Mount Lemmon Survey ||  || align=right | 2.5 km || 
|-id=443 bgcolor=#fefefe
| 581443 ||  || — || April 3, 2011 || Haleakala || Pan-STARRS ||  || align=right data-sort-value="0.78" | 780 m || 
|-id=444 bgcolor=#d6d6d6
| 581444 ||  || — || January 16, 2009 || Mount Lemmon || Mount Lemmon Survey ||  || align=right | 2.5 km || 
|-id=445 bgcolor=#d6d6d6
| 581445 ||  || — || October 8, 2012 || Haleakala || Pan-STARRS ||  || align=right | 2.8 km || 
|-id=446 bgcolor=#d6d6d6
| 581446 ||  || — || October 16, 2012 || Kitt Peak || Spacewatch ||  || align=right | 2.9 km || 
|-id=447 bgcolor=#d6d6d6
| 581447 ||  || — || October 18, 2012 || Haleakala || Pan-STARRS ||  || align=right | 2.5 km || 
|-id=448 bgcolor=#E9E9E9
| 581448 ||  || — || October 20, 2003 || Kitt Peak || Spacewatch ||  || align=right | 2.0 km || 
|-id=449 bgcolor=#d6d6d6
| 581449 ||  || — || April 20, 2015 || Haleakala || Pan-STARRS ||  || align=right | 2.3 km || 
|-id=450 bgcolor=#d6d6d6
| 581450 ||  || — || October 22, 2012 || Front Royal || D. R. Skillman ||  || align=right | 2.2 km || 
|-id=451 bgcolor=#d6d6d6
| 581451 ||  || — || January 6, 2003 || Kitt Peak || I. dell'Antonio, D. Loomba ||  || align=right | 3.4 km || 
|-id=452 bgcolor=#d6d6d6
| 581452 ||  || — || March 21, 2015 || Haleakala || Pan-STARRS ||  || align=right | 2.5 km || 
|-id=453 bgcolor=#d6d6d6
| 581453 ||  || — || February 19, 2009 || Kitt Peak || Spacewatch ||  || align=right | 1.8 km || 
|-id=454 bgcolor=#d6d6d6
| 581454 ||  || — || March 28, 2015 || Haleakala || Pan-STARRS ||  || align=right | 1.7 km || 
|-id=455 bgcolor=#E9E9E9
| 581455 ||  || — || April 20, 2015 || Haleakala || Pan-STARRS ||  || align=right | 2.2 km || 
|-id=456 bgcolor=#d6d6d6
| 581456 ||  || — || December 30, 2013 || Haleakala || Pan-STARRS ||  || align=right | 2.9 km || 
|-id=457 bgcolor=#d6d6d6
| 581457 ||  || — || March 28, 2015 || Haleakala || Pan-STARRS ||  || align=right | 2.3 km || 
|-id=458 bgcolor=#fefefe
| 581458 ||  || — || December 27, 2006 || Mount Lemmon || Mount Lemmon Survey ||  || align=right data-sort-value="0.66" | 660 m || 
|-id=459 bgcolor=#d6d6d6
| 581459 ||  || — || May 19, 2010 || Mount Lemmon || Mount Lemmon Survey ||  || align=right | 2.4 km || 
|-id=460 bgcolor=#fefefe
| 581460 ||  || — || May 20, 2012 || Mount Lemmon || Mount Lemmon Survey ||  || align=right data-sort-value="0.94" | 940 m || 
|-id=461 bgcolor=#E9E9E9
| 581461 ||  || — || October 7, 2008 || Mount Lemmon || Mount Lemmon Survey ||  || align=right | 1.8 km || 
|-id=462 bgcolor=#E9E9E9
| 581462 ||  || — || September 18, 2012 || Catalina || CSS ||  || align=right | 2.0 km || 
|-id=463 bgcolor=#E9E9E9
| 581463 ||  || — || June 7, 2011 || Mount Lemmon || Mount Lemmon Survey ||  || align=right | 2.5 km || 
|-id=464 bgcolor=#d6d6d6
| 581464 ||  || — || October 17, 2012 || Haleakala || Pan-STARRS ||  || align=right | 3.4 km || 
|-id=465 bgcolor=#fefefe
| 581465 ||  || — || April 18, 2015 || Haleakala || Pan-STARRS ||  || align=right data-sort-value="0.78" | 780 m || 
|-id=466 bgcolor=#d6d6d6
| 581466 ||  || — || September 18, 2006 || Kitt Peak || Spacewatch ||  || align=right | 2.6 km || 
|-id=467 bgcolor=#E9E9E9
| 581467 ||  || — || March 18, 2010 || Mount Lemmon || Mount Lemmon Survey ||  || align=right | 2.0 km || 
|-id=468 bgcolor=#d6d6d6
| 581468 ||  || — || February 1, 2009 || Kitt Peak || Spacewatch ||  || align=right | 2.7 km || 
|-id=469 bgcolor=#d6d6d6
| 581469 ||  || — || April 18, 2015 || Haleakala || Pan-STARRS ||  || align=right | 2.4 km || 
|-id=470 bgcolor=#d6d6d6
| 581470 ||  || — || June 19, 2010 || Mount Lemmon || Mount Lemmon Survey ||  || align=right | 3.9 km || 
|-id=471 bgcolor=#E9E9E9
| 581471 ||  || — || March 22, 2001 || Kitt Peak || Spacewatch ||  || align=right | 1.5 km || 
|-id=472 bgcolor=#fefefe
| 581472 ||  || — || March 4, 2011 || Mount Lemmon || Mount Lemmon Survey ||  || align=right data-sort-value="0.68" | 680 m || 
|-id=473 bgcolor=#fefefe
| 581473 ||  || — || October 1, 2005 || Mount Lemmon || Mount Lemmon Survey ||  || align=right data-sort-value="0.62" | 620 m || 
|-id=474 bgcolor=#E9E9E9
| 581474 ||  || — || October 17, 2012 || Haleakala || Pan-STARRS ||  || align=right data-sort-value="0.82" | 820 m || 
|-id=475 bgcolor=#d6d6d6
| 581475 ||  || — || June 19, 2010 || Mount Lemmon || Mount Lemmon Survey ||  || align=right | 2.4 km || 
|-id=476 bgcolor=#d6d6d6
| 581476 ||  || — || October 9, 2007 || Mount Lemmon || Mount Lemmon Survey ||  || align=right | 1.9 km || 
|-id=477 bgcolor=#d6d6d6
| 581477 ||  || — || September 17, 2006 || Kitt Peak || Spacewatch ||  || align=right | 2.6 km || 
|-id=478 bgcolor=#d6d6d6
| 581478 ||  || — || April 23, 2015 || Haleakala || Pan-STARRS ||  || align=right | 2.0 km || 
|-id=479 bgcolor=#d6d6d6
| 581479 ||  || — || October 22, 2012 || Haleakala || Pan-STARRS ||  || align=right | 2.8 km || 
|-id=480 bgcolor=#d6d6d6
| 581480 ||  || — || October 11, 2007 || Mount Lemmon || Mount Lemmon Survey ||  || align=right | 1.8 km || 
|-id=481 bgcolor=#d6d6d6
| 581481 ||  || — || February 28, 2009 || Kitt Peak || Spacewatch ||  || align=right | 2.1 km || 
|-id=482 bgcolor=#E9E9E9
| 581482 ||  || — || October 8, 2012 || Haleakala || Pan-STARRS ||  || align=right | 1.6 km || 
|-id=483 bgcolor=#d6d6d6
| 581483 ||  || — || March 12, 2005 || Kitt Peak || M. W. Buie, L. H. Wasserman ||  || align=right | 1.9 km || 
|-id=484 bgcolor=#d6d6d6
| 581484 ||  || — || October 18, 2012 || Haleakala || Pan-STARRS ||  || align=right | 2.3 km || 
|-id=485 bgcolor=#E9E9E9
| 581485 ||  || — || September 17, 2012 || Mount Lemmon || Mount Lemmon Survey ||  || align=right | 1.9 km || 
|-id=486 bgcolor=#d6d6d6
| 581486 ||  || — || October 2, 1995 || Kitt Peak || Spacewatch ||  || align=right | 1.6 km || 
|-id=487 bgcolor=#d6d6d6
| 581487 ||  || — || April 10, 2010 || Kitt Peak || Spacewatch ||  || align=right | 2.5 km || 
|-id=488 bgcolor=#d6d6d6
| 581488 ||  || — || April 14, 2010 || Kitt Peak || Spacewatch ||  || align=right | 2.2 km || 
|-id=489 bgcolor=#d6d6d6
| 581489 ||  || — || August 29, 2006 || Kitt Peak || Spacewatch ||  || align=right | 2.8 km || 
|-id=490 bgcolor=#E9E9E9
| 581490 ||  || — || May 12, 2011 || Nogales || M. Schwartz, P. R. Holvorcem ||  || align=right | 1.3 km || 
|-id=491 bgcolor=#d6d6d6
| 581491 ||  || — || October 18, 2012 || Haleakala || Pan-STARRS ||  || align=right | 2.7 km || 
|-id=492 bgcolor=#E9E9E9
| 581492 ||  || — || April 23, 2015 || Haleakala || Pan-STARRS ||  || align=right data-sort-value="0.71" | 710 m || 
|-id=493 bgcolor=#d6d6d6
| 581493 ||  || — || July 1, 2011 || Kitt Peak || Spacewatch ||  || align=right | 2.3 km || 
|-id=494 bgcolor=#d6d6d6
| 581494 ||  || — || October 23, 2006 || Kitt Peak || Spacewatch ||  || align=right | 2.7 km || 
|-id=495 bgcolor=#d6d6d6
| 581495 ||  || — || April 14, 2010 || Kitt Peak || Spacewatch ||  || align=right | 2.0 km || 
|-id=496 bgcolor=#d6d6d6
| 581496 ||  || — || August 27, 2011 || Haleakala || Pan-STARRS ||  || align=right | 2.3 km || 
|-id=497 bgcolor=#d6d6d6
| 581497 ||  || — || October 20, 2007 || Mount Lemmon || Mount Lemmon Survey ||  || align=right | 3.1 km || 
|-id=498 bgcolor=#d6d6d6
| 581498 ||  || — || September 17, 2006 || Kitt Peak || Spacewatch ||  || align=right | 2.4 km || 
|-id=499 bgcolor=#d6d6d6
| 581499 ||  || — || September 25, 2006 || Kitt Peak || Spacewatch ||  || align=right | 2.4 km || 
|-id=500 bgcolor=#E9E9E9
| 581500 ||  || — || November 15, 2003 || Kitt Peak || Spacewatch ||  || align=right | 1.7 km || 
|}

581501–581600 

|-bgcolor=#fefefe
| 581501 ||  || — || March 12, 2007 || Kitt Peak || Spacewatch ||  || align=right data-sort-value="0.62" | 620 m || 
|-id=502 bgcolor=#d6d6d6
| 581502 ||  || — || March 17, 2015 || Haleakala || Pan-STARRS ||  || align=right | 2.4 km || 
|-id=503 bgcolor=#d6d6d6
| 581503 ||  || — || October 20, 2006 || Kitt Peak || Spacewatch ||  || align=right | 2.5 km || 
|-id=504 bgcolor=#E9E9E9
| 581504 ||  || — || September 15, 2007 || Mount Lemmon || Mount Lemmon Survey ||  || align=right | 1.8 km || 
|-id=505 bgcolor=#d6d6d6
| 581505 ||  || — || January 31, 2015 || Haleakala || Pan-STARRS ||  || align=right | 2.5 km || 
|-id=506 bgcolor=#d6d6d6
| 581506 ||  || — || November 2, 2007 || Mount Lemmon || Mount Lemmon Survey ||  || align=right | 1.8 km || 
|-id=507 bgcolor=#d6d6d6
| 581507 ||  || — || January 25, 2009 || Kitt Peak || Spacewatch ||  || align=right | 2.3 km || 
|-id=508 bgcolor=#E9E9E9
| 581508 ||  || — || January 3, 2014 || Kitt Peak || Spacewatch ||  || align=right | 2.0 km || 
|-id=509 bgcolor=#E9E9E9
| 581509 ||  || — || February 23, 2015 || Haleakala || Pan-STARRS ||  || align=right | 1.9 km || 
|-id=510 bgcolor=#d6d6d6
| 581510 ||  || — || April 13, 2015 || Haleakala || Pan-STARRS ||  || align=right | 2.2 km || 
|-id=511 bgcolor=#d6d6d6
| 581511 ||  || — || February 18, 2009 || La Sagra || OAM Obs. ||  || align=right | 2.1 km || 
|-id=512 bgcolor=#d6d6d6
| 581512 ||  || — || April 16, 2015 || Haleakala || Pan-STARRS 2 ||  || align=right | 1.7 km || 
|-id=513 bgcolor=#d6d6d6
| 581513 ||  || — || January 10, 2014 || Mount Lemmon || Mount Lemmon Survey ||  || align=right | 2.3 km || 
|-id=514 bgcolor=#E9E9E9
| 581514 ||  || — || March 6, 2014 || Mount Lemmon || Mount Lemmon Survey ||  || align=right | 2.4 km || 
|-id=515 bgcolor=#E9E9E9
| 581515 ||  || — || December 20, 2009 || Mount Lemmon || Mount Lemmon Survey ||  || align=right | 1.5 km || 
|-id=516 bgcolor=#d6d6d6
| 581516 ||  || — || March 28, 2015 || Haleakala || Pan-STARRS ||  || align=right | 2.2 km || 
|-id=517 bgcolor=#d6d6d6
| 581517 ||  || — || January 1, 2014 || Mount Lemmon || Mount Lemmon Survey ||  || align=right | 2.2 km || 
|-id=518 bgcolor=#d6d6d6
| 581518 ||  || — || March 28, 2015 || Haleakala || Pan-STARRS ||  || align=right | 2.0 km || 
|-id=519 bgcolor=#d6d6d6
| 581519 ||  || — || November 12, 2013 || Mount Lemmon || Mount Lemmon Survey ||  || align=right | 2.4 km || 
|-id=520 bgcolor=#d6d6d6
| 581520 ||  || — || April 13, 2015 || Haleakala || Pan-STARRS ||  || align=right | 1.6 km || 
|-id=521 bgcolor=#d6d6d6
| 581521 ||  || — || November 2, 2012 || Haleakala || Pan-STARRS ||  || align=right | 2.4 km || 
|-id=522 bgcolor=#d6d6d6
| 581522 ||  || — || October 23, 2001 || Anderson Mesa || LONEOS ||  || align=right | 3.5 km || 
|-id=523 bgcolor=#fefefe
| 581523 ||  || — || October 29, 2005 || Catalina || CSS || H || align=right data-sort-value="0.54" | 540 m || 
|-id=524 bgcolor=#fefefe
| 581524 ||  || — || September 5, 2013 || Crni Vrh || J. Vales || H || align=right data-sort-value="0.76" | 760 m || 
|-id=525 bgcolor=#E9E9E9
| 581525 ||  || — || April 23, 2015 || Haleakala || Pan-STARRS ||  || align=right | 1.6 km || 
|-id=526 bgcolor=#E9E9E9
| 581526 ||  || — || October 9, 2012 || Mount Lemmon || Mount Lemmon Survey ||  || align=right | 1.9 km || 
|-id=527 bgcolor=#d6d6d6
| 581527 ||  || — || January 29, 2014 || Mount Lemmon || Mount Lemmon Survey ||  || align=right | 2.1 km || 
|-id=528 bgcolor=#d6d6d6
| 581528 ||  || — || October 8, 2007 || Kitt Peak || Spacewatch ||  || align=right | 1.7 km || 
|-id=529 bgcolor=#d6d6d6
| 581529 ||  || — || November 22, 2012 || Kitt Peak || Spacewatch ||  || align=right | 1.7 km || 
|-id=530 bgcolor=#d6d6d6
| 581530 ||  || — || October 21, 2012 || Mount Lemmon || Mount Lemmon Survey ||  || align=right | 2.4 km || 
|-id=531 bgcolor=#E9E9E9
| 581531 ||  || — || September 16, 2012 || Kitt Peak || Spacewatch ||  || align=right | 1.5 km || 
|-id=532 bgcolor=#fefefe
| 581532 ||  || — || April 2, 2011 || Kitt Peak || Spacewatch ||  || align=right data-sort-value="0.85" | 850 m || 
|-id=533 bgcolor=#d6d6d6
| 581533 ||  || — || October 30, 2005 || Mount Lemmon || Mount Lemmon Survey ||  || align=right | 2.1 km || 
|-id=534 bgcolor=#E9E9E9
| 581534 ||  || — || April 23, 2015 || Haleakala || Pan-STARRS ||  || align=right data-sort-value="0.78" | 780 m || 
|-id=535 bgcolor=#d6d6d6
| 581535 ||  || — || April 23, 2015 || Haleakala || Pan-STARRS ||  || align=right | 1.6 km || 
|-id=536 bgcolor=#d6d6d6
| 581536 ||  || — || January 22, 2015 || Haleakala || Pan-STARRS ||  || align=right | 2.8 km || 
|-id=537 bgcolor=#d6d6d6
| 581537 ||  || — || January 20, 2009 || Kitt Peak || Spacewatch ||  || align=right | 1.9 km || 
|-id=538 bgcolor=#d6d6d6
| 581538 ||  || — || January 31, 2009 || Mount Lemmon || Mount Lemmon Survey ||  || align=right | 2.0 km || 
|-id=539 bgcolor=#d6d6d6
| 581539 ||  || — || December 4, 2007 || Mount Lemmon || Mount Lemmon Survey ||  || align=right | 3.2 km || 
|-id=540 bgcolor=#d6d6d6
| 581540 ||  || — || September 18, 2012 || Mount Lemmon || Mount Lemmon Survey ||  || align=right | 2.4 km || 
|-id=541 bgcolor=#d6d6d6
| 581541 ||  || — || February 2, 2009 || Mount Lemmon || Mount Lemmon Survey ||  || align=right | 2.1 km || 
|-id=542 bgcolor=#d6d6d6
| 581542 ||  || — || December 5, 2007 || Mount Lemmon || Mount Lemmon Survey || TIR || align=right | 2.0 km || 
|-id=543 bgcolor=#d6d6d6
| 581543 ||  || — || November 16, 2006 || Kitt Peak || Spacewatch ||  || align=right | 2.5 km || 
|-id=544 bgcolor=#d6d6d6
| 581544 ||  || — || March 30, 2004 || Kitt Peak || Spacewatch || EOS || align=right | 2.1 km || 
|-id=545 bgcolor=#E9E9E9
| 581545 ||  || — || January 23, 2015 || Haleakala || Pan-STARRS ||  || align=right | 1.5 km || 
|-id=546 bgcolor=#E9E9E9
| 581546 ||  || — || October 18, 2012 || Haleakala || Pan-STARRS ||  || align=right | 1.3 km || 
|-id=547 bgcolor=#d6d6d6
| 581547 ||  || — || June 12, 2011 || Mount Lemmon || Mount Lemmon Survey ||  || align=right | 2.2 km || 
|-id=548 bgcolor=#E9E9E9
| 581548 ||  || — || October 8, 2012 || Kitt Peak || Spacewatch ||  || align=right | 1.7 km || 
|-id=549 bgcolor=#E9E9E9
| 581549 ||  || — || June 3, 2011 || Mount Lemmon || Mount Lemmon Survey ||  || align=right | 1.5 km || 
|-id=550 bgcolor=#fefefe
| 581550 ||  || — || March 11, 2007 || Mount Lemmon || Mount Lemmon Survey ||  || align=right data-sort-value="0.62" | 620 m || 
|-id=551 bgcolor=#d6d6d6
| 581551 ||  || — || April 24, 2015 || Haleakala || Pan-STARRS ||  || align=right | 2.2 km || 
|-id=552 bgcolor=#fefefe
| 581552 ||  || — || April 24, 2015 || Haleakala || Pan-STARRS 2 ||  || align=right data-sort-value="0.68" | 680 m || 
|-id=553 bgcolor=#fefefe
| 581553 ||  || — || October 3, 2005 || Palomar || NEAT || H || align=right data-sort-value="0.78" | 780 m || 
|-id=554 bgcolor=#C2FFFF
| 581554 ||  || — || May 6, 2003 || Kitt Peak || Spacewatch || L4 || align=right | 12 km || 
|-id=555 bgcolor=#d6d6d6
| 581555 ||  || — || April 1, 2015 || Haleakala || Pan-STARRS ||  || align=right | 2.5 km || 
|-id=556 bgcolor=#d6d6d6
| 581556 ||  || — || June 27, 2005 || Kitt Peak || Spacewatch ||  || align=right | 4.3 km || 
|-id=557 bgcolor=#d6d6d6
| 581557 ||  || — || January 29, 2009 || Mount Lemmon || Mount Lemmon Survey ||  || align=right | 2.4 km || 
|-id=558 bgcolor=#d6d6d6
| 581558 ||  || — || March 15, 2004 || Palomar || NEAT ||  || align=right | 3.7 km || 
|-id=559 bgcolor=#d6d6d6
| 581559 ||  || — || March 17, 2015 || Haleakala || Pan-STARRS ||  || align=right | 2.7 km || 
|-id=560 bgcolor=#d6d6d6
| 581560 ||  || — || January 28, 2015 || Haleakala || Pan-STARRS ||  || align=right | 2.2 km || 
|-id=561 bgcolor=#d6d6d6
| 581561 ||  || — || November 9, 2007 || Kitt Peak || Spacewatch ||  || align=right | 2.8 km || 
|-id=562 bgcolor=#fefefe
| 581562 ||  || — || April 22, 2015 || Space Surveillance || Space Surveillance Telescope ||  || align=right data-sort-value="0.86" | 860 m || 
|-id=563 bgcolor=#fefefe
| 581563 ||  || — || April 21, 2004 || Campo Imperatore || CINEOS ||  || align=right data-sort-value="0.74" | 740 m || 
|-id=564 bgcolor=#C2FFFF
| 581564 ||  || — || November 17, 2011 || Kitt Peak || Spacewatch || L4 || align=right | 12 km || 
|-id=565 bgcolor=#fefefe
| 581565 ||  || — || February 19, 2012 || Catalina || CSS || H || align=right data-sort-value="0.75" | 750 m || 
|-id=566 bgcolor=#d6d6d6
| 581566 ||  || — || April 2, 2009 || Kitt Peak || Spacewatch ||  || align=right | 2.6 km || 
|-id=567 bgcolor=#d6d6d6
| 581567 ||  || — || April 18, 2015 || Haleakala || Pan-STARRS ||  || align=right | 2.9 km || 
|-id=568 bgcolor=#d6d6d6
| 581568 ||  || — || December 30, 2007 || Mount Lemmon || Mount Lemmon Survey ||  || align=right | 2.9 km || 
|-id=569 bgcolor=#d6d6d6
| 581569 ||  || — || January 31, 2009 || Mount Lemmon || Mount Lemmon Survey ||  || align=right | 1.8 km || 
|-id=570 bgcolor=#d6d6d6
| 581570 ||  || — || April 25, 2015 || Haleakala || Pan-STARRS ||  || align=right | 1.8 km || 
|-id=571 bgcolor=#d6d6d6
| 581571 ||  || — || July 4, 2005 || Mount Lemmon || Mount Lemmon Survey ||  || align=right | 2.2 km || 
|-id=572 bgcolor=#d6d6d6
| 581572 ||  || — || April 23, 2015 || Haleakala || Pan-STARRS ||  || align=right | 2.3 km || 
|-id=573 bgcolor=#d6d6d6
| 581573 ||  || — || April 23, 2015 || Haleakala || Pan-STARRS ||  || align=right | 2.0 km || 
|-id=574 bgcolor=#d6d6d6
| 581574 ||  || — || December 14, 2012 || Charleston || R. Holmes ||  || align=right | 2.4 km || 
|-id=575 bgcolor=#d6d6d6
| 581575 ||  || — || April 25, 2015 || Haleakala || Pan-STARRS ||  || align=right | 2.8 km || 
|-id=576 bgcolor=#d6d6d6
| 581576 ||  || — || June 29, 2016 || Haleakala || Pan-STARRS ||  || align=right | 2.2 km || 
|-id=577 bgcolor=#d6d6d6
| 581577 ||  || — || April 25, 2015 || Haleakala || Pan-STARRS ||  || align=right | 1.7 km || 
|-id=578 bgcolor=#d6d6d6
| 581578 ||  || — || April 25, 2015 || Haleakala || Pan-STARRS ||  || align=right | 1.8 km || 
|-id=579 bgcolor=#d6d6d6
| 581579 ||  || — || April 24, 2015 || Haleakala || Pan-STARRS ||  || align=right | 1.9 km || 
|-id=580 bgcolor=#d6d6d6
| 581580 ||  || — || April 23, 2015 || Haleakala || Pan-STARRS ||  || align=right | 2.0 km || 
|-id=581 bgcolor=#d6d6d6
| 581581 ||  || — || April 24, 2015 || Haleakala || Pan-STARRS ||  || align=right | 1.9 km || 
|-id=582 bgcolor=#d6d6d6
| 581582 ||  || — || April 25, 2015 || Haleakala || Pan-STARRS ||  || align=right | 2.8 km || 
|-id=583 bgcolor=#d6d6d6
| 581583 ||  || — || April 23, 2015 || Haleakala || Pan-STARRS ||  || align=right | 2.1 km || 
|-id=584 bgcolor=#fefefe
| 581584 ||  || — || April 23, 2015 || Haleakala || Pan-STARRS ||  || align=right data-sort-value="0.59" | 590 m || 
|-id=585 bgcolor=#d6d6d6
| 581585 ||  || — || April 25, 2015 || Haleakala || Pan-STARRS ||  || align=right | 2.0 km || 
|-id=586 bgcolor=#d6d6d6
| 581586 ||  || — || April 23, 2015 || Haleakala || Pan-STARRS ||  || align=right | 2.1 km || 
|-id=587 bgcolor=#d6d6d6
| 581587 ||  || — || April 23, 2015 || La Palma || La Palma Obs. ||  || align=right | 1.9 km || 
|-id=588 bgcolor=#d6d6d6
| 581588 ||  || — || April 20, 2015 || Kitt Peak || Spacewatch ||  || align=right | 2.2 km || 
|-id=589 bgcolor=#E9E9E9
| 581589 ||  || — || April 24, 2015 || Haleakala || Pan-STARRS ||  || align=right | 1.6 km || 
|-id=590 bgcolor=#fefefe
| 581590 ||  || — || April 18, 2015 || Haleakala || Pan-STARRS ||  || align=right data-sort-value="0.82" | 820 m || 
|-id=591 bgcolor=#fefefe
| 581591 ||  || — || November 3, 2013 || Palomar || PTF || H || align=right data-sort-value="0.74" | 740 m || 
|-id=592 bgcolor=#E9E9E9
| 581592 ||  || — || April 26, 2011 || Haleakala || Pan-STARRS ||  || align=right data-sort-value="0.98" | 980 m || 
|-id=593 bgcolor=#d6d6d6
| 581593 ||  || — || November 17, 2006 || Kitt Peak || Spacewatch ||  || align=right | 3.6 km || 
|-id=594 bgcolor=#d6d6d6
| 581594 ||  || — || May 15, 2015 || Haleakala || Pan-STARRS ||  || align=right | 2.2 km || 
|-id=595 bgcolor=#d6d6d6
| 581595 ||  || — || June 24, 2011 || Kitt Peak || Spacewatch ||  || align=right | 2.5 km || 
|-id=596 bgcolor=#E9E9E9
| 581596 ||  || — || November 11, 2013 || Mount Lemmon || Mount Lemmon Survey ||  || align=right | 2.0 km || 
|-id=597 bgcolor=#d6d6d6
| 581597 ||  || — || March 3, 2009 || Mount Lemmon || Mount Lemmon Survey ||  || align=right | 2.7 km || 
|-id=598 bgcolor=#E9E9E9
| 581598 ||  || — || May 30, 2011 || Haleakala || Pan-STARRS ||  || align=right data-sort-value="0.98" | 980 m || 
|-id=599 bgcolor=#E9E9E9
| 581599 ||  || — || January 1, 2014 || Mount Lemmon || Mount Lemmon Survey ||  || align=right | 2.6 km || 
|-id=600 bgcolor=#E9E9E9
| 581600 ||  || — || February 9, 2005 || Mount Lemmon || Mount Lemmon Survey ||  || align=right | 2.6 km || 
|}

581601–581700 

|-bgcolor=#d6d6d6
| 581601 ||  || — || January 26, 2014 || Haleakala || Pan-STARRS || 7:4 || align=right | 2.9 km || 
|-id=602 bgcolor=#d6d6d6
| 581602 ||  || — || April 21, 2004 || Kitt Peak || Spacewatch ||  || align=right | 2.4 km || 
|-id=603 bgcolor=#d6d6d6
| 581603 ||  || — || May 13, 2015 || Haleakala || Pan-STARRS ||  || align=right | 2.5 km || 
|-id=604 bgcolor=#d6d6d6
| 581604 ||  || — || May 14, 2015 || Haleakala || Pan-STARRS ||  || align=right | 2.3 km || 
|-id=605 bgcolor=#d6d6d6
| 581605 ||  || — || May 10, 2015 || Mount Lemmon || Mount Lemmon Survey ||  || align=right | 2.7 km || 
|-id=606 bgcolor=#d6d6d6
| 581606 ||  || — || May 11, 2015 || Mount Lemmon || Mount Lemmon Survey ||  || align=right | 2.3 km || 
|-id=607 bgcolor=#d6d6d6
| 581607 ||  || — || May 12, 2015 || Mount Lemmon || Mount Lemmon Survey ||  || align=right | 2.1 km || 
|-id=608 bgcolor=#E9E9E9
| 581608 ||  || — || May 12, 2015 || Mount Lemmon || Mount Lemmon Survey ||  || align=right | 1.2 km || 
|-id=609 bgcolor=#d6d6d6
| 581609 ||  || — || October 18, 2012 || Haleakala || Pan-STARRS ||  || align=right | 2.3 km || 
|-id=610 bgcolor=#d6d6d6
| 581610 ||  || — || December 14, 2013 || Mount Lemmon || Mount Lemmon Survey ||  || align=right | 2.9 km || 
|-id=611 bgcolor=#fefefe
| 581611 ||  || — || October 14, 2001 || Kitt Peak || Spacewatch ||  || align=right data-sort-value="0.94" | 940 m || 
|-id=612 bgcolor=#d6d6d6
| 581612 ||  || — || October 3, 2008 || Mount Lemmon || Mount Lemmon Survey ||  || align=right | 2.8 km || 
|-id=613 bgcolor=#d6d6d6
| 581613 ||  || — || January 18, 2015 || Haleakala || Pan-STARRS ||  || align=right | 2.3 km || 
|-id=614 bgcolor=#d6d6d6
| 581614 ||  || — || May 9, 2015 || Haleakala || Pan-STARRS 2 ||  || align=right | 2.9 km || 
|-id=615 bgcolor=#d6d6d6
| 581615 ||  || — || September 24, 2011 || Haleakala || Pan-STARRS ||  || align=right | 2.5 km || 
|-id=616 bgcolor=#d6d6d6
| 581616 ||  || — || November 9, 2007 || Kitt Peak || Spacewatch ||  || align=right | 2.6 km || 
|-id=617 bgcolor=#d6d6d6
| 581617 ||  || — || December 4, 2012 || Mount Lemmon || Mount Lemmon Survey ||  || align=right | 2.2 km || 
|-id=618 bgcolor=#d6d6d6
| 581618 ||  || — || April 23, 2015 || Haleakala || Pan-STARRS 2 ||  || align=right | 2.6 km || 
|-id=619 bgcolor=#E9E9E9
| 581619 ||  || — || September 17, 2003 || Kitt Peak || Spacewatch ||  || align=right | 1.2 km || 
|-id=620 bgcolor=#d6d6d6
| 581620 ||  || — || May 18, 2015 || Haleakala || Pan-STARRS ||  || align=right | 2.6 km || 
|-id=621 bgcolor=#E9E9E9
| 581621 ||  || — || May 14, 2015 || Haleakala || Pan-STARRS ||  || align=right data-sort-value="0.94" | 940 m || 
|-id=622 bgcolor=#d6d6d6
| 581622 ||  || — || October 23, 2011 || Haleakala || Pan-STARRS ||  || align=right | 3.5 km || 
|-id=623 bgcolor=#d6d6d6
| 581623 ||  || — || May 18, 2015 || Haleakala || Pan-STARRS ||  || align=right | 2.2 km || 
|-id=624 bgcolor=#d6d6d6
| 581624 ||  || — || August 30, 2011 || Kitt Peak || Spacewatch ||  || align=right | 2.3 km || 
|-id=625 bgcolor=#d6d6d6
| 581625 ||  || — || February 22, 2014 || Kitt Peak || Spacewatch ||  || align=right | 2.6 km || 
|-id=626 bgcolor=#fefefe
| 581626 ||  || — || December 2, 2008 || Kitt Peak || Spacewatch || H || align=right data-sort-value="0.58" | 580 m || 
|-id=627 bgcolor=#d6d6d6
| 581627 ||  || — || July 18, 2010 || Siding Spring || SSS ||  || align=right | 4.2 km || 
|-id=628 bgcolor=#d6d6d6
| 581628 ||  || — || July 18, 2005 || Palomar || NEAT ||  || align=right | 2.7 km || 
|-id=629 bgcolor=#d6d6d6
| 581629 ||  || — || March 23, 2003 || Apache Point || SDSS Collaboration ||  || align=right | 2.9 km || 
|-id=630 bgcolor=#d6d6d6
| 581630 ||  || — || June 30, 2005 || Palomar || NEAT ||  || align=right | 2.8 km || 
|-id=631 bgcolor=#d6d6d6
| 581631 ||  || — || April 29, 2009 || Mount Lemmon || Mount Lemmon Survey ||  || align=right | 2.7 km || 
|-id=632 bgcolor=#d6d6d6
| 581632 ||  || — || April 1, 2003 || Palomar || NEAT ||  || align=right | 3.4 km || 
|-id=633 bgcolor=#d6d6d6
| 581633 ||  || — || April 20, 2015 || Haleakala || Pan-STARRS ||  || align=right | 2.5 km || 
|-id=634 bgcolor=#d6d6d6
| 581634 ||  || — || January 11, 2008 || Kitt Peak || Spacewatch ||  || align=right | 2.4 km || 
|-id=635 bgcolor=#d6d6d6
| 581635 ||  || — || May 18, 2015 || Haleakala || Pan-STARRS ||  || align=right | 1.8 km || 
|-id=636 bgcolor=#d6d6d6
| 581636 ||  || — || January 13, 2008 || Mount Lemmon || Mount Lemmon Survey ||  || align=right | 2.9 km || 
|-id=637 bgcolor=#d6d6d6
| 581637 ||  || — || December 31, 2013 || Kitt Peak || Spacewatch ||  || align=right | 2.3 km || 
|-id=638 bgcolor=#C2FFFF
| 581638 ||  || — || October 9, 2008 || Mount Lemmon || Mount Lemmon Survey || L4 || align=right | 9.2 km || 
|-id=639 bgcolor=#d6d6d6
| 581639 ||  || — || April 18, 2015 || Haleakala || Pan-STARRS ||  || align=right | 2.7 km || 
|-id=640 bgcolor=#d6d6d6
| 581640 ||  || — || May 19, 2015 || Haleakala || Pan-STARRS ||  || align=right | 2.3 km || 
|-id=641 bgcolor=#d6d6d6
| 581641 ||  || — || April 18, 2015 || Mount Lemmon || Mount Lemmon Survey ||  || align=right | 1.9 km || 
|-id=642 bgcolor=#d6d6d6
| 581642 ||  || — || October 22, 2012 || Haleakala || Pan-STARRS ||  || align=right | 2.2 km || 
|-id=643 bgcolor=#d6d6d6
| 581643 ||  || — || February 10, 2014 || Haleakala || Pan-STARRS ||  || align=right | 2.5 km || 
|-id=644 bgcolor=#d6d6d6
| 581644 ||  || — || November 4, 2007 || Kitt Peak || Spacewatch ||  || align=right | 2.8 km || 
|-id=645 bgcolor=#E9E9E9
| 581645 ||  || — || May 19, 2015 || Haleakala || Pan-STARRS ||  || align=right | 1.7 km || 
|-id=646 bgcolor=#d6d6d6
| 581646 ||  || — || August 5, 2011 || Piszkesteto || A. Pál ||  || align=right | 3.3 km || 
|-id=647 bgcolor=#d6d6d6
| 581647 ||  || — || July 9, 2005 || Kitt Peak || Spacewatch ||  || align=right | 2.3 km || 
|-id=648 bgcolor=#d6d6d6
| 581648 ||  || — || November 9, 2007 || Kitt Peak || Spacewatch ||  || align=right | 2.2 km || 
|-id=649 bgcolor=#d6d6d6
| 581649 ||  || — || December 16, 2007 || Mount Lemmon || Mount Lemmon Survey ||  || align=right | 2.3 km || 
|-id=650 bgcolor=#d6d6d6
| 581650 ||  || — || May 9, 2004 || Kitt Peak || Spacewatch ||  || align=right | 3.4 km || 
|-id=651 bgcolor=#d6d6d6
| 581651 ||  || — || August 26, 2011 || Piszkesteto || K. Sárneczky ||  || align=right | 2.6 km || 
|-id=652 bgcolor=#fefefe
| 581652 ||  || — || October 6, 2012 || Mount Lemmon || Mount Lemmon Survey ||  || align=right data-sort-value="0.59" | 590 m || 
|-id=653 bgcolor=#d6d6d6
| 581653 ||  || — || May 20, 2015 || Haleakala || Pan-STARRS ||  || align=right | 2.0 km || 
|-id=654 bgcolor=#d6d6d6
| 581654 ||  || — || April 27, 2009 || Mount Lemmon || Mount Lemmon Survey ||  || align=right | 2.3 km || 
|-id=655 bgcolor=#E9E9E9
| 581655 ||  || — || March 21, 2015 || Haleakala || Pan-STARRS ||  || align=right | 1.2 km || 
|-id=656 bgcolor=#d6d6d6
| 581656 ||  || — || May 20, 2015 || Haleakala || Pan-STARRS ||  || align=right | 2.8 km || 
|-id=657 bgcolor=#E9E9E9
| 581657 ||  || — || May 20, 2015 || Haleakala || Pan-STARRS ||  || align=right data-sort-value="0.94" | 940 m || 
|-id=658 bgcolor=#d6d6d6
| 581658 ||  || — || March 13, 2014 || Mount Lemmon || Mount Lemmon Survey ||  || align=right | 2.9 km || 
|-id=659 bgcolor=#E9E9E9
| 581659 ||  || — || May 20, 2015 || Haleakala || Pan-STARRS ||  || align=right | 1.0 km || 
|-id=660 bgcolor=#d6d6d6
| 581660 ||  || — || March 20, 2004 || Kitt Peak || Spacewatch ||  || align=right | 2.0 km || 
|-id=661 bgcolor=#d6d6d6
| 581661 ||  || — || October 17, 2012 || Mount Lemmon || Mount Lemmon Survey ||  || align=right | 3.2 km || 
|-id=662 bgcolor=#d6d6d6
| 581662 ||  || — || September 29, 2011 || Mount Lemmon || Mount Lemmon Survey ||  || align=right | 2.5 km || 
|-id=663 bgcolor=#d6d6d6
| 581663 ||  || — || April 4, 2005 || Mount Lemmon || Mount Lemmon Survey ||  || align=right | 2.5 km || 
|-id=664 bgcolor=#d6d6d6
| 581664 ||  || — || December 30, 2007 || Mount Lemmon || Mount Lemmon Survey ||  || align=right | 3.0 km || 
|-id=665 bgcolor=#d6d6d6
| 581665 ||  || — || May 20, 2015 || Haleakala || Pan-STARRS ||  || align=right | 2.4 km || 
|-id=666 bgcolor=#d6d6d6
| 581666 ||  || — || May 20, 2015 || Haleakala || Pan-STARRS ||  || align=right | 2.2 km || 
|-id=667 bgcolor=#E9E9E9
| 581667 ||  || — || March 30, 2015 || Haleakala || Pan-STARRS ||  || align=right data-sort-value="0.86" | 860 m || 
|-id=668 bgcolor=#d6d6d6
| 581668 ||  || — || June 12, 2011 || Mount Lemmon || Mount Lemmon Survey ||  || align=right | 3.4 km || 
|-id=669 bgcolor=#d6d6d6
| 581669 ||  || — || May 20, 2015 || Haleakala || Pan-STARRS ||  || align=right | 2.3 km || 
|-id=670 bgcolor=#d6d6d6
| 581670 ||  || — || November 4, 2007 || Kitt Peak || Spacewatch ||  || align=right | 2.2 km || 
|-id=671 bgcolor=#d6d6d6
| 581671 ||  || — || March 28, 2015 || Haleakala || Pan-STARRS ||  || align=right | 2.7 km || 
|-id=672 bgcolor=#d6d6d6
| 581672 ||  || — || February 1, 2009 || Mount Lemmon || Mount Lemmon Survey ||  || align=right | 2.3 km || 
|-id=673 bgcolor=#d6d6d6
| 581673 ||  || — || May 11, 2010 || Mount Lemmon || Mount Lemmon Survey ||  || align=right | 2.2 km || 
|-id=674 bgcolor=#d6d6d6
| 581674 ||  || — || March 2, 2009 || Kitt Peak || Spacewatch ||  || align=right | 3.2 km || 
|-id=675 bgcolor=#d6d6d6
| 581675 ||  || — || May 21, 2015 || Haleakala || Pan-STARRS ||  || align=right | 2.8 km || 
|-id=676 bgcolor=#d6d6d6
| 581676 ||  || — || May 11, 2015 || Mount Lemmon || Mount Lemmon Survey ||  || align=right | 1.7 km || 
|-id=677 bgcolor=#d6d6d6
| 581677 ||  || — || May 21, 2015 || Haleakala || Pan-STARRS ||  || align=right | 2.3 km || 
|-id=678 bgcolor=#d6d6d6
| 581678 ||  || — || April 28, 2015 || Catalina || CSS ||  || align=right | 3.0 km || 
|-id=679 bgcolor=#d6d6d6
| 581679 ||  || — || December 31, 2007 || Mount Lemmon || Mount Lemmon Survey ||  || align=right | 2.5 km || 
|-id=680 bgcolor=#E9E9E9
| 581680 ||  || — || May 23, 2003 || Kitt Peak || Spacewatch ||  || align=right data-sort-value="0.82" | 820 m || 
|-id=681 bgcolor=#d6d6d6
| 581681 ||  || — || July 3, 2005 || Mount Lemmon || Mount Lemmon Survey ||  || align=right | 2.9 km || 
|-id=682 bgcolor=#d6d6d6
| 581682 ||  || — || August 27, 2011 || Haleakala || Pan-STARRS ||  || align=right | 1.7 km || 
|-id=683 bgcolor=#d6d6d6
| 581683 ||  || — || May 21, 2015 || Haleakala || Pan-STARRS ||  || align=right | 2.0 km || 
|-id=684 bgcolor=#d6d6d6
| 581684 ||  || — || March 3, 2009 || Mount Lemmon || Mount Lemmon Survey ||  || align=right | 2.0 km || 
|-id=685 bgcolor=#d6d6d6
| 581685 ||  || — || May 21, 2015 || Haleakala || Pan-STARRS ||  || align=right | 2.0 km || 
|-id=686 bgcolor=#d6d6d6
| 581686 ||  || — || September 21, 2011 || Mount Lemmon || Mount Lemmon Survey ||  || align=right | 2.8 km || 
|-id=687 bgcolor=#d6d6d6
| 581687 ||  || — || January 25, 2014 || Haleakala || Pan-STARRS ||  || align=right | 1.8 km || 
|-id=688 bgcolor=#d6d6d6
| 581688 ||  || — || February 25, 2014 || Kitt Peak || Spacewatch ||  || align=right | 2.7 km || 
|-id=689 bgcolor=#d6d6d6
| 581689 ||  || — || April 23, 2015 || Haleakala || Pan-STARRS ||  || align=right | 2.3 km || 
|-id=690 bgcolor=#d6d6d6
| 581690 ||  || — || April 23, 2015 || Haleakala || Pan-STARRS ||  || align=right | 1.9 km || 
|-id=691 bgcolor=#d6d6d6
| 581691 ||  || — || May 21, 2015 || Haleakala || Pan-STARRS ||  || align=right | 1.9 km || 
|-id=692 bgcolor=#d6d6d6
| 581692 ||  || — || November 13, 2006 || Catalina || CSS ||  || align=right | 4.2 km || 
|-id=693 bgcolor=#d6d6d6
| 581693 ||  || — || September 25, 2011 || Haleakala || Pan-STARRS ||  || align=right | 2.1 km || 
|-id=694 bgcolor=#d6d6d6
| 581694 ||  || — || August 28, 2006 || Kitt Peak || Spacewatch ||  || align=right | 2.0 km || 
|-id=695 bgcolor=#d6d6d6
| 581695 ||  || — || February 28, 2009 || Kitt Peak || Spacewatch ||  || align=right | 2.2 km || 
|-id=696 bgcolor=#E9E9E9
| 581696 ||  || — || July 18, 2002 || Palomar || NEAT ||  || align=right | 2.0 km || 
|-id=697 bgcolor=#d6d6d6
| 581697 ||  || — || May 21, 2015 || Haleakala || Pan-STARRS ||  || align=right | 1.8 km || 
|-id=698 bgcolor=#d6d6d6
| 581698 ||  || — || February 26, 2014 || Mount Lemmon || Mount Lemmon Survey ||  || align=right | 3.2 km || 
|-id=699 bgcolor=#d6d6d6
| 581699 ||  || — || December 12, 2012 || Mount Lemmon || Mount Lemmon Survey ||  || align=right | 2.0 km || 
|-id=700 bgcolor=#d6d6d6
| 581700 ||  || — || May 21, 2015 || Haleakala || Pan-STARRS ||  || align=right | 2.7 km || 
|}

581701–581800 

|-bgcolor=#d6d6d6
| 581701 ||  || — || January 17, 2008 || Mount Lemmon || Mount Lemmon Survey ||  || align=right | 3.1 km || 
|-id=702 bgcolor=#E9E9E9
| 581702 ||  || — || March 28, 2015 || Haleakala || Pan-STARRS ||  || align=right | 1.3 km || 
|-id=703 bgcolor=#d6d6d6
| 581703 ||  || — || December 31, 2007 || Mount Lemmon || Mount Lemmon Survey ||  || align=right | 2.6 km || 
|-id=704 bgcolor=#d6d6d6
| 581704 ||  || — || December 4, 2012 || Mount Lemmon || Mount Lemmon Survey ||  || align=right | 2.3 km || 
|-id=705 bgcolor=#d6d6d6
| 581705 ||  || — || March 31, 2015 || Haleakala || Pan-STARRS ||  || align=right | 2.4 km || 
|-id=706 bgcolor=#d6d6d6
| 581706 ||  || — || January 31, 2009 || Mount Lemmon || Mount Lemmon Survey ||  || align=right | 2.1 km || 
|-id=707 bgcolor=#d6d6d6
| 581707 ||  || — || May 21, 2015 || Haleakala || Pan-STARRS ||  || align=right | 2.4 km || 
|-id=708 bgcolor=#d6d6d6
| 581708 ||  || — || May 21, 2015 || Haleakala || Pan-STARRS ||  || align=right | 2.4 km || 
|-id=709 bgcolor=#d6d6d6
| 581709 ||  || — || March 28, 2015 || Haleakala || Pan-STARRS ||  || align=right | 2.2 km || 
|-id=710 bgcolor=#d6d6d6
| 581710 ||  || — || February 20, 2009 || Kitt Peak || Spacewatch ||  || align=right | 2.3 km || 
|-id=711 bgcolor=#d6d6d6
| 581711 ||  || — || March 7, 2003 || Kitt Peak || Kitt Peak Obs. ||  || align=right | 1.9 km || 
|-id=712 bgcolor=#d6d6d6
| 581712 ||  || — || April 23, 2015 || Haleakala || Pan-STARRS ||  || align=right | 2.0 km || 
|-id=713 bgcolor=#d6d6d6
| 581713 ||  || — || May 13, 2015 || Mount Lemmon || Mount Lemmon Survey ||  || align=right | 2.3 km || 
|-id=714 bgcolor=#d6d6d6
| 581714 ||  || — || May 13, 2015 || Mount Lemmon || Mount Lemmon Survey ||  || align=right | 1.8 km || 
|-id=715 bgcolor=#E9E9E9
| 581715 ||  || — || October 10, 2002 || Palomar || NEAT ||  || align=right | 2.4 km || 
|-id=716 bgcolor=#d6d6d6
| 581716 ||  || — || April 23, 2015 || Haleakala || Pan-STARRS ||  || align=right | 2.1 km || 
|-id=717 bgcolor=#d6d6d6
| 581717 ||  || — || October 22, 1995 || Kitt Peak || Spacewatch ||  || align=right | 2.0 km || 
|-id=718 bgcolor=#d6d6d6
| 581718 ||  || — || March 21, 2015 || Haleakala || Pan-STARRS ||  || align=right | 2.5 km || 
|-id=719 bgcolor=#d6d6d6
| 581719 ||  || — || April 23, 2015 || Haleakala || Pan-STARRS ||  || align=right | 1.8 km || 
|-id=720 bgcolor=#d6d6d6
| 581720 ||  || — || March 29, 2009 || Kitt Peak || Spacewatch ||  || align=right | 2.0 km || 
|-id=721 bgcolor=#d6d6d6
| 581721 ||  || — || December 3, 2012 || Mount Lemmon || Mount Lemmon Survey ||  || align=right | 2.5 km || 
|-id=722 bgcolor=#E9E9E9
| 581722 ||  || — || October 21, 2008 || Mount Lemmon || Mount Lemmon Survey ||  || align=right data-sort-value="0.70" | 700 m || 
|-id=723 bgcolor=#d6d6d6
| 581723 ||  || — || March 30, 2015 || Haleakala || Pan-STARRS ||  || align=right | 2.5 km || 
|-id=724 bgcolor=#d6d6d6
| 581724 ||  || — || March 12, 2004 || Palomar || NEAT ||  || align=right | 2.7 km || 
|-id=725 bgcolor=#d6d6d6
| 581725 ||  || — || January 26, 2014 || Haleakala || Pan-STARRS ||  || align=right | 1.9 km || 
|-id=726 bgcolor=#E9E9E9
| 581726 ||  || — || September 15, 1998 || Kitt Peak || Spacewatch ||  || align=right | 1.6 km || 
|-id=727 bgcolor=#d6d6d6
| 581727 ||  || — || May 21, 2015 || Haleakala || Pan-STARRS ||  || align=right | 1.9 km || 
|-id=728 bgcolor=#d6d6d6
| 581728 ||  || — || February 26, 2014 || Mount Lemmon || Mount Lemmon Survey || EOS || align=right | 1.8 km || 
|-id=729 bgcolor=#d6d6d6
| 581729 ||  || — || March 10, 2008 || Kitt Peak || Spacewatch || 7:4 || align=right | 2.7 km || 
|-id=730 bgcolor=#d6d6d6
| 581730 ||  || — || February 26, 2014 || Mount Lemmon || Mount Lemmon Survey ||  || align=right | 2.6 km || 
|-id=731 bgcolor=#E9E9E9
| 581731 ||  || — || April 21, 2006 || Kitt Peak || Spacewatch ||  || align=right | 1.1 km || 
|-id=732 bgcolor=#d6d6d6
| 581732 ||  || — || April 19, 2009 || Mount Lemmon || Mount Lemmon Survey ||  || align=right | 2.5 km || 
|-id=733 bgcolor=#d6d6d6
| 581733 ||  || — || December 4, 2012 || Mount Lemmon || Mount Lemmon Survey ||  || align=right | 2.5 km || 
|-id=734 bgcolor=#d6d6d6
| 581734 ||  || — || September 30, 2006 || Mount Lemmon || Mount Lemmon Survey ||  || align=right | 2.9 km || 
|-id=735 bgcolor=#E9E9E9
| 581735 ||  || — || March 30, 2015 || Haleakala || Pan-STARRS ||  || align=right | 1.3 km || 
|-id=736 bgcolor=#E9E9E9
| 581736 ||  || — || May 21, 2015 || Haleakala || Pan-STARRS ||  || align=right data-sort-value="0.86" | 860 m || 
|-id=737 bgcolor=#E9E9E9
| 581737 ||  || — || May 21, 2015 || Haleakala || Pan-STARRS ||  || align=right data-sort-value="0.78" | 780 m || 
|-id=738 bgcolor=#d6d6d6
| 581738 ||  || — || November 11, 2007 || Mount Lemmon || Mount Lemmon Survey ||  || align=right | 2.7 km || 
|-id=739 bgcolor=#d6d6d6
| 581739 ||  || — || May 18, 2015 || Mount Lemmon || Mount Lemmon Survey ||  || align=right | 2.3 km || 
|-id=740 bgcolor=#d6d6d6
| 581740 ||  || — || May 21, 2015 || Haleakala || Pan-STARRS ||  || align=right | 2.0 km || 
|-id=741 bgcolor=#d6d6d6
| 581741 ||  || — || May 21, 2015 || Haleakala || Pan-STARRS ||  || align=right | 2.3 km || 
|-id=742 bgcolor=#d6d6d6
| 581742 ||  || — || May 9, 2005 || Kitt Peak || Spacewatch ||  || align=right | 3.0 km || 
|-id=743 bgcolor=#d6d6d6
| 581743 ||  || — || December 4, 2007 || Mount Lemmon || Mount Lemmon Survey ||  || align=right | 3.0 km || 
|-id=744 bgcolor=#d6d6d6
| 581744 ||  || — || September 24, 2011 || Haleakala || Pan-STARRS ||  || align=right | 2.8 km || 
|-id=745 bgcolor=#d6d6d6
| 581745 ||  || — || April 1, 2009 || Mount Lemmon || Mount Lemmon Survey ||  || align=right | 2.8 km || 
|-id=746 bgcolor=#d6d6d6
| 581746 ||  || — || May 14, 2015 || Haleakala || Pan-STARRS ||  || align=right | 2.4 km || 
|-id=747 bgcolor=#E9E9E9
| 581747 ||  || — || March 30, 2015 || Haleakala || Pan-STARRS ||  || align=right | 1.6 km || 
|-id=748 bgcolor=#d6d6d6
| 581748 ||  || — || May 15, 2004 || Campo Imperatore || CINEOS ||  || align=right | 1.9 km || 
|-id=749 bgcolor=#d6d6d6
| 581749 ||  || — || May 21, 2015 || Haleakala || Pan-STARRS ||  || align=right | 2.5 km || 
|-id=750 bgcolor=#d6d6d6
| 581750 ||  || — || November 11, 2001 || Apache Point || SDSS Collaboration ||  || align=right | 2.3 km || 
|-id=751 bgcolor=#d6d6d6
| 581751 ||  || — || January 30, 2008 || Kitt Peak || Spacewatch ||  || align=right | 2.9 km || 
|-id=752 bgcolor=#E9E9E9
| 581752 ||  || — || January 1, 2009 || Mount Lemmon || Mount Lemmon Survey ||  || align=right | 2.6 km || 
|-id=753 bgcolor=#d6d6d6
| 581753 ||  || — || October 19, 2012 || Mount Lemmon || Mount Lemmon Survey ||  || align=right | 3.2 km || 
|-id=754 bgcolor=#d6d6d6
| 581754 ||  || — || March 28, 2015 || Haleakala || Pan-STARRS ||  || align=right | 2.9 km || 
|-id=755 bgcolor=#d6d6d6
| 581755 ||  || — || January 31, 2009 || Kitt Peak || Spacewatch ||  || align=right | 2.5 km || 
|-id=756 bgcolor=#d6d6d6
| 581756 ||  || — || April 18, 2015 || Haleakala || Pan-STARRS ||  || align=right | 1.9 km || 
|-id=757 bgcolor=#d6d6d6
| 581757 ||  || — || May 21, 2015 || Haleakala || Pan-STARRS 2 ||  || align=right | 2.5 km || 
|-id=758 bgcolor=#E9E9E9
| 581758 ||  || — || April 25, 2015 || Haleakala || Pan-STARRS ||  || align=right data-sort-value="0.94" | 940 m || 
|-id=759 bgcolor=#d6d6d6
| 581759 ||  || — || October 22, 2006 || Catalina || CSS ||  || align=right | 3.2 km || 
|-id=760 bgcolor=#d6d6d6
| 581760 ||  || — || May 10, 2015 || Mount Lemmon || Mount Lemmon Survey ||  || align=right | 2.5 km || 
|-id=761 bgcolor=#d6d6d6
| 581761 ||  || — || April 10, 2015 || Mount Lemmon || Mount Lemmon Survey ||  || align=right | 1.9 km || 
|-id=762 bgcolor=#d6d6d6
| 581762 ||  || — || August 21, 2006 || Piszkesteto || K. Sárneczky, Z. Kuli ||  || align=right | 2.6 km || 
|-id=763 bgcolor=#d6d6d6
| 581763 ||  || — || April 11, 2015 || Mount Lemmon || Mount Lemmon Survey ||  || align=right | 3.0 km || 
|-id=764 bgcolor=#fefefe
| 581764 ||  || — || May 22, 2015 || Haleakala || Pan-STARRS ||  || align=right data-sort-value="0.82" | 820 m || 
|-id=765 bgcolor=#E9E9E9
| 581765 ||  || — || October 8, 2008 || Mount Lemmon || Mount Lemmon Survey ||  || align=right | 2.4 km || 
|-id=766 bgcolor=#d6d6d6
| 581766 ||  || — || February 24, 2014 || Haleakala || Pan-STARRS ||  || align=right | 3.4 km || 
|-id=767 bgcolor=#E9E9E9
| 581767 ||  || — || April 20, 2015 || Kitt Peak || Spacewatch ||  || align=right | 1.0 km || 
|-id=768 bgcolor=#d6d6d6
| 581768 ||  || — || March 8, 2009 || Mount Lemmon || Mount Lemmon Survey ||  || align=right | 3.6 km || 
|-id=769 bgcolor=#d6d6d6
| 581769 ||  || — || April 18, 2015 || Mount Lemmon || Mount Lemmon Survey ||  || align=right | 2.4 km || 
|-id=770 bgcolor=#d6d6d6
| 581770 ||  || — || March 17, 2004 || Kitt Peak || Spacewatch ||  || align=right | 2.3 km || 
|-id=771 bgcolor=#d6d6d6
| 581771 ||  || — || May 24, 2015 || Haleakala || Pan-STARRS ||  || align=right | 1.9 km || 
|-id=772 bgcolor=#E9E9E9
| 581772 ||  || — || September 21, 2003 || Palomar || NEAT ||  || align=right | 2.8 km || 
|-id=773 bgcolor=#fefefe
| 581773 ||  || — || October 11, 2005 || Kitt Peak || Spacewatch ||  || align=right data-sort-value="0.43" | 430 m || 
|-id=774 bgcolor=#E9E9E9
| 581774 ||  || — || May 24, 2015 || Haleakala || Pan-STARRS ||  || align=right | 1.2 km || 
|-id=775 bgcolor=#d6d6d6
| 581775 ||  || — || May 24, 2015 || Haleakala || Pan-STARRS ||  || align=right | 2.5 km || 
|-id=776 bgcolor=#d6d6d6
| 581776 ||  || — || February 25, 2003 || Campo Imperatore || CINEOS || THM || align=right | 2.9 km || 
|-id=777 bgcolor=#d6d6d6
| 581777 ||  || — || February 10, 2014 || Mount Lemmon || Mount Lemmon Survey ||  || align=right | 2.6 km || 
|-id=778 bgcolor=#E9E9E9
| 581778 ||  || — || May 20, 2015 || Haleakala || Pan-STARRS ||  || align=right | 2.3 km || 
|-id=779 bgcolor=#d6d6d6
| 581779 ||  || — || February 24, 2014 || Haleakala || Pan-STARRS ||  || align=right | 2.7 km || 
|-id=780 bgcolor=#d6d6d6
| 581780 ||  || — || March 2, 2009 || Kitt Peak || Spacewatch ||  || align=right | 2.3 km || 
|-id=781 bgcolor=#d6d6d6
| 581781 ||  || — || October 15, 2001 || Palomar || NEAT ||  || align=right | 2.7 km || 
|-id=782 bgcolor=#d6d6d6
| 581782 ||  || — || May 18, 2015 || Haleakala || Pan-STARRS 2 ||  || align=right | 2.1 km || 
|-id=783 bgcolor=#E9E9E9
| 581783 ||  || — || October 20, 2012 || Haleakala || Pan-STARRS ||  || align=right | 1.1 km || 
|-id=784 bgcolor=#E9E9E9
| 581784 ||  || — || April 18, 2015 || Haleakala || Pan-STARRS || MAR || align=right | 1.1 km || 
|-id=785 bgcolor=#d6d6d6
| 581785 ||  || — || December 22, 2012 || Haleakala || Pan-STARRS ||  || align=right | 2.5 km || 
|-id=786 bgcolor=#d6d6d6
| 581786 ||  || — || February 11, 2014 || Mount Lemmon || Mount Lemmon Survey ||  || align=right | 2.9 km || 
|-id=787 bgcolor=#d6d6d6
| 581787 ||  || — || September 4, 2011 || Haleakala || Pan-STARRS ||  || align=right | 1.9 km || 
|-id=788 bgcolor=#E9E9E9
| 581788 ||  || — || October 22, 2003 || Kitt Peak || Spacewatch ||  || align=right | 2.3 km || 
|-id=789 bgcolor=#d6d6d6
| 581789 ||  || — || May 23, 2004 || Kitt Peak || Spacewatch ||  || align=right | 2.3 km || 
|-id=790 bgcolor=#d6d6d6
| 581790 ||  || — || May 11, 2010 || Mount Lemmon || Mount Lemmon Survey ||  || align=right | 2.4 km || 
|-id=791 bgcolor=#d6d6d6
| 581791 ||  || — || February 24, 2014 || Haleakala || Pan-STARRS ||  || align=right | 2.7 km || 
|-id=792 bgcolor=#d6d6d6
| 581792 ||  || — || September 2, 2011 || Haleakala || Pan-STARRS ||  || align=right | 2.8 km || 
|-id=793 bgcolor=#d6d6d6
| 581793 ||  || — || May 25, 2015 || Haleakala || Pan-STARRS ||  || align=right | 2.7 km || 
|-id=794 bgcolor=#d6d6d6
| 581794 ||  || — || December 16, 2007 || Mount Lemmon || Mount Lemmon Survey ||  || align=right | 3.6 km || 
|-id=795 bgcolor=#d6d6d6
| 581795 ||  || — || May 25, 2015 || Haleakala || Pan-STARRS 2 ||  || align=right | 2.1 km || 
|-id=796 bgcolor=#d6d6d6
| 581796 ||  || — || January 9, 2014 || Haleakala || Pan-STARRS ||  || align=right | 2.4 km || 
|-id=797 bgcolor=#d6d6d6
| 581797 ||  || — || May 26, 2015 || Haleakala || Pan-STARRS ||  || align=right | 2.3 km || 
|-id=798 bgcolor=#d6d6d6
| 581798 ||  || — || April 13, 2004 || Kitt Peak || Spacewatch ||  || align=right | 2.6 km || 
|-id=799 bgcolor=#E9E9E9
| 581799 ||  || — || March 25, 2006 || Kitt Peak || Spacewatch ||  || align=right | 1.5 km || 
|-id=800 bgcolor=#d6d6d6
| 581800 ||  || — || March 15, 2004 || Kitt Peak || Spacewatch ||  || align=right | 1.7 km || 
|}

581801–581900 

|-bgcolor=#d6d6d6
| 581801 ||  || — || October 3, 2011 || Taunus || S. Karge, U. Zimmer ||  || align=right | 1.9 km || 
|-id=802 bgcolor=#d6d6d6
| 581802 ||  || — || March 6, 2014 || Kitt Peak || Spacewatch ||  || align=right | 2.5 km || 
|-id=803 bgcolor=#d6d6d6
| 581803 ||  || — || May 21, 2015 || Haleakala || Pan-STARRS ||  || align=right | 2.3 km || 
|-id=804 bgcolor=#C2E0FF
| 581804 ||  || — || May 29, 2014 || Mauna Kea || Mauna Kea Obs. || twotinocritical || align=right | 92 km || 
|-id=805 bgcolor=#d6d6d6
| 581805 ||  || — || February 10, 2014 || Haleakala || Pan-STARRS ||  || align=right | 2.0 km || 
|-id=806 bgcolor=#d6d6d6
| 581806 ||  || — || May 18, 2015 || Haleakala || Pan-STARRS 2 ||  || align=right | 2.6 km || 
|-id=807 bgcolor=#d6d6d6
| 581807 ||  || — || September 4, 2011 || Haleakala || Pan-STARRS ||  || align=right | 2.2 km || 
|-id=808 bgcolor=#E9E9E9
| 581808 ||  || — || February 12, 2002 || Kitt Peak || Spacewatch ||  || align=right data-sort-value="0.82" | 820 m || 
|-id=809 bgcolor=#E9E9E9
| 581809 ||  || — || October 20, 2003 || Kitt Peak || Spacewatch ||  || align=right | 2.0 km || 
|-id=810 bgcolor=#d6d6d6
| 581810 ||  || — || September 17, 2010 || Mount Lemmon || Mount Lemmon Survey ||  || align=right | 1.8 km || 
|-id=811 bgcolor=#d6d6d6
| 581811 ||  || — || May 21, 2015 || Haleakala || Pan-STARRS ||  || align=right | 2.1 km || 
|-id=812 bgcolor=#d6d6d6
| 581812 ||  || — || September 4, 2011 || Haleakala || Pan-STARRS ||  || align=right | 2.0 km || 
|-id=813 bgcolor=#d6d6d6
| 581813 ||  || — || May 21, 2015 || Haleakala || Pan-STARRS ||  || align=right | 2.2 km || 
|-id=814 bgcolor=#d6d6d6
| 581814 ||  || — || November 11, 2012 || Nogales || M. Schwartz, P. R. Holvorcem ||  || align=right | 2.7 km || 
|-id=815 bgcolor=#d6d6d6
| 581815 ||  || — || September 21, 2011 || Kitt Peak || Spacewatch ||  || align=right | 2.2 km || 
|-id=816 bgcolor=#d6d6d6
| 581816 ||  || — || August 1, 2016 || Haleakala || Pan-STARRS ||  || align=right | 1.9 km || 
|-id=817 bgcolor=#d6d6d6
| 581817 ||  || — || May 24, 2015 || Haleakala || Pan-STARRS ||  || align=right | 1.9 km || 
|-id=818 bgcolor=#E9E9E9
| 581818 ||  || — || July 14, 2016 || Haleakala || Pan-STARRS ||  || align=right data-sort-value="0.73" | 730 m || 
|-id=819 bgcolor=#d6d6d6
| 581819 ||  || — || May 21, 2015 || Haleakala || Pan-STARRS ||  || align=right | 2.4 km || 
|-id=820 bgcolor=#E9E9E9
| 581820 ||  || — || May 25, 2015 || Haleakala || Pan-STARRS ||  || align=right | 1.0 km || 
|-id=821 bgcolor=#d6d6d6
| 581821 ||  || — || May 21, 2015 || Haleakala || Pan-STARRS ||  || align=right | 1.8 km || 
|-id=822 bgcolor=#d6d6d6
| 581822 ||  || — || May 27, 2015 || Mount Lemmon || Mount Lemmon Survey ||  || align=right | 1.9 km || 
|-id=823 bgcolor=#E9E9E9
| 581823 ||  || — || May 24, 2015 || Haleakala || Pan-STARRS ||  || align=right | 1.1 km || 
|-id=824 bgcolor=#d6d6d6
| 581824 ||  || — || May 22, 2015 || Haleakala || Pan-STARRS ||  || align=right | 2.0 km || 
|-id=825 bgcolor=#E9E9E9
| 581825 ||  || — || May 25, 2015 || Haleakala || Pan-STARRS ||  || align=right | 1.1 km || 
|-id=826 bgcolor=#d6d6d6
| 581826 ||  || — || May 21, 2015 || Haleakala || Pan-STARRS ||  || align=right | 2.1 km || 
|-id=827 bgcolor=#d6d6d6
| 581827 ||  || — || May 25, 2015 || Haleakala || Pan-STARRS ||  || align=right | 2.1 km || 
|-id=828 bgcolor=#d6d6d6
| 581828 ||  || — || May 26, 2015 || Haleakala || Pan-STARRS ||  || align=right | 2.7 km || 
|-id=829 bgcolor=#d6d6d6
| 581829 ||  || — || May 21, 2015 || Haleakala || Pan-STARRS ||  || align=right | 2.0 km || 
|-id=830 bgcolor=#d6d6d6
| 581830 ||  || — || February 1, 2009 || Catalina || CSS ||  || align=right | 3.8 km || 
|-id=831 bgcolor=#E9E9E9
| 581831 ||  || — || March 29, 2015 || Haleakala || Pan-STARRS ||  || align=right data-sort-value="0.75" | 750 m || 
|-id=832 bgcolor=#E9E9E9
| 581832 ||  || — || January 8, 2010 || Mount Lemmon || Mount Lemmon Survey ||  || align=right | 1.1 km || 
|-id=833 bgcolor=#d6d6d6
| 581833 ||  || — || December 11, 2013 || Haleakala || Pan-STARRS ||  || align=right | 2.6 km || 
|-id=834 bgcolor=#E9E9E9
| 581834 ||  || — || January 14, 2002 || Palomar || NEAT ||  || align=right | 1.3 km || 
|-id=835 bgcolor=#d6d6d6
| 581835 ||  || — || June 9, 2010 || Kitt Peak || Spacewatch ||  || align=right | 2.8 km || 
|-id=836 bgcolor=#d6d6d6
| 581836 ||  || — || March 28, 2015 || Haleakala || Pan-STARRS ||  || align=right | 2.2 km || 
|-id=837 bgcolor=#E9E9E9
| 581837 ||  || — || September 14, 2007 || Mount Lemmon || Mount Lemmon Survey ||  || align=right | 1.6 km || 
|-id=838 bgcolor=#d6d6d6
| 581838 ||  || — || November 26, 2012 || Mount Lemmon || Mount Lemmon Survey ||  || align=right | 3.1 km || 
|-id=839 bgcolor=#d6d6d6
| 581839 ||  || — || December 8, 2012 || Mount Lemmon || Mount Lemmon Survey ||  || align=right | 2.4 km || 
|-id=840 bgcolor=#d6d6d6
| 581840 ||  || — || June 9, 2015 || Haleakala || Pan-STARRS ||  || align=right | 4.1 km || 
|-id=841 bgcolor=#E9E9E9
| 581841 ||  || — || June 13, 2007 || Kitt Peak || Spacewatch ||  || align=right | 1.8 km || 
|-id=842 bgcolor=#E9E9E9
| 581842 ||  || — || May 14, 2015 || Haleakala || Pan-STARRS ||  || align=right | 1.3 km || 
|-id=843 bgcolor=#E9E9E9
| 581843 ||  || — || June 7, 2015 || Haleakala || Pan-STARRS ||  || align=right data-sort-value="0.98" | 980 m || 
|-id=844 bgcolor=#d6d6d6
| 581844 ||  || — || March 11, 2014 || Mount Lemmon || Mount Lemmon Survey ||  || align=right | 2.6 km || 
|-id=845 bgcolor=#E9E9E9
| 581845 ||  || — || December 8, 2012 || Mount Lemmon || Mount Lemmon Survey ||  || align=right | 1.8 km || 
|-id=846 bgcolor=#d6d6d6
| 581846 ||  || — || September 4, 2011 || Haleakala || Pan-STARRS ||  || align=right | 2.8 km || 
|-id=847 bgcolor=#E9E9E9
| 581847 ||  || — || June 11, 2015 || Haleakala || Pan-STARRS ||  || align=right data-sort-value="0.90" | 900 m || 
|-id=848 bgcolor=#d6d6d6
| 581848 ||  || — || June 11, 2015 || Haleakala || Pan-STARRS ||  || align=right | 2.6 km || 
|-id=849 bgcolor=#d6d6d6
| 581849 ||  || — || November 25, 2011 || Haleakala || Pan-STARRS ||  || align=right | 2.3 km || 
|-id=850 bgcolor=#d6d6d6
| 581850 ||  || — || June 11, 2015 || Haleakala || Pan-STARRS ||  || align=right | 2.0 km || 
|-id=851 bgcolor=#d6d6d6
| 581851 ||  || — || May 17, 2009 || Mount Lemmon || Mount Lemmon Survey ||  || align=right | 2.5 km || 
|-id=852 bgcolor=#d6d6d6
| 581852 ||  || — || February 10, 2014 || Mount Lemmon || Mount Lemmon Survey ||  || align=right | 2.4 km || 
|-id=853 bgcolor=#d6d6d6
| 581853 ||  || — || June 11, 2015 || Haleakala || Pan-STARRS ||  || align=right | 3.3 km || 
|-id=854 bgcolor=#fefefe
| 581854 ||  || — || November 10, 2005 || Mount Lemmon || Mount Lemmon Survey ||  || align=right | 1.1 km || 
|-id=855 bgcolor=#d6d6d6
| 581855 ||  || — || March 8, 2014 || Mount Lemmon || Mount Lemmon Survey ||  || align=right | 2.5 km || 
|-id=856 bgcolor=#E9E9E9
| 581856 ||  || — || October 17, 2007 || Mount Lemmon || Mount Lemmon Survey ||  || align=right | 2.3 km || 
|-id=857 bgcolor=#E9E9E9
| 581857 ||  || — || February 14, 2010 || Mount Lemmon || Mount Lemmon Survey ||  || align=right | 1.1 km || 
|-id=858 bgcolor=#E9E9E9
| 581858 ||  || — || October 26, 2008 || Mount Lemmon || Mount Lemmon Survey ||  || align=right | 1.3 km || 
|-id=859 bgcolor=#d6d6d6
| 581859 ||  || — || May 21, 2015 || Haleakala || Pan-STARRS ||  || align=right | 1.9 km || 
|-id=860 bgcolor=#E9E9E9
| 581860 ||  || — || May 21, 2015 || Haleakala || Pan-STARRS ||  || align=right | 1.5 km || 
|-id=861 bgcolor=#d6d6d6
| 581861 ||  || — || April 27, 2009 || Mount Lemmon || Mount Lemmon Survey ||  || align=right | 2.8 km || 
|-id=862 bgcolor=#E9E9E9
| 581862 ||  || — || June 13, 2015 || Haleakala || Pan-STARRS ||  || align=right data-sort-value="0.94" | 940 m || 
|-id=863 bgcolor=#E9E9E9
| 581863 ||  || — || January 28, 2014 || Mount Lemmon || Mount Lemmon Survey ||  || align=right data-sort-value="0.99" | 990 m || 
|-id=864 bgcolor=#E9E9E9
| 581864 ||  || — || December 5, 2005 || Kitt Peak || Spacewatch ||  || align=right data-sort-value="0.79" | 790 m || 
|-id=865 bgcolor=#d6d6d6
| 581865 ||  || — || August 30, 2005 || Kitt Peak || Spacewatch ||  || align=right | 2.1 km || 
|-id=866 bgcolor=#E9E9E9
| 581866 ||  || — || December 27, 2013 || Mount Lemmon || Mount Lemmon Survey ||  || align=right | 1.1 km || 
|-id=867 bgcolor=#d6d6d6
| 581867 ||  || — || June 13, 2015 || Haleakala || Pan-STARRS ||  || align=right | 2.2 km || 
|-id=868 bgcolor=#d6d6d6
| 581868 ||  || — || June 3, 2005 || Kitt Peak || Spacewatch ||  || align=right | 2.8 km || 
|-id=869 bgcolor=#E9E9E9
| 581869 ||  || — || January 31, 2006 || Mount Lemmon || Mount Lemmon Survey ||  || align=right | 1.1 km || 
|-id=870 bgcolor=#d6d6d6
| 581870 ||  || — || June 13, 2015 || Haleakala || Pan-STARRS ||  || align=right | 2.6 km || 
|-id=871 bgcolor=#d6d6d6
| 581871 ||  || — || October 23, 2011 || Haleakala || Pan-STARRS ||  || align=right | 2.9 km || 
|-id=872 bgcolor=#E9E9E9
| 581872 ||  || — || June 13, 2015 || Haleakala || Pan-STARRS ||  || align=right | 1.8 km || 
|-id=873 bgcolor=#E9E9E9
| 581873 ||  || — || December 29, 2013 || Haleakala || Pan-STARRS ||  || align=right data-sort-value="0.89" | 890 m || 
|-id=874 bgcolor=#fefefe
| 581874 ||  || — || June 14, 2015 || Mount Lemmon || Mount Lemmon Survey ||  || align=right data-sort-value="0.64" | 640 m || 
|-id=875 bgcolor=#d6d6d6
| 581875 ||  || — || August 26, 2011 || Piszkesteto || K. Sárneczky ||  || align=right | 3.0 km || 
|-id=876 bgcolor=#d6d6d6
| 581876 ||  || — || October 31, 2006 || Mount Lemmon || Mount Lemmon Survey ||  || align=right | 2.6 km || 
|-id=877 bgcolor=#d6d6d6
| 581877 ||  || — || April 23, 2015 || Haleakala || Pan-STARRS ||  || align=right | 1.8 km || 
|-id=878 bgcolor=#d6d6d6
| 581878 ||  || — || April 1, 2003 || Apache Point || SDSS Collaboration ||  || align=right | 3.7 km || 
|-id=879 bgcolor=#d6d6d6
| 581879 ||  || — || June 7, 2015 || Haleakala || Pan-STARRS ||  || align=right | 2.6 km || 
|-id=880 bgcolor=#d6d6d6
| 581880 ||  || — || June 10, 2015 || Haleakala || Pan-STARRS ||  || align=right | 2.7 km || 
|-id=881 bgcolor=#d6d6d6
| 581881 ||  || — || April 30, 2009 || Kitt Peak || Spacewatch ||  || align=right | 2.2 km || 
|-id=882 bgcolor=#d6d6d6
| 581882 ||  || — || September 29, 2011 || Mount Lemmon || Mount Lemmon Survey ||  || align=right | 2.2 km || 
|-id=883 bgcolor=#E9E9E9
| 581883 ||  || — || June 15, 2015 || Mount Lemmon || Mount Lemmon Survey ||  || align=right | 1.3 km || 
|-id=884 bgcolor=#d6d6d6
| 581884 ||  || — || February 13, 2002 || Apache Point || SDSS Collaboration ||  || align=right | 3.7 km || 
|-id=885 bgcolor=#d6d6d6
| 581885 ||  || — || March 24, 2014 || Haleakala || Pan-STARRS ||  || align=right | 2.2 km || 
|-id=886 bgcolor=#d6d6d6
| 581886 ||  || — || February 6, 2013 || Nogales || M. Schwartz, P. R. Holvorcem ||  || align=right | 3.4 km || 
|-id=887 bgcolor=#d6d6d6
| 581887 ||  || — || June 15, 2015 || Haleakala || Pan-STARRS ||  || align=right | 2.4 km || 
|-id=888 bgcolor=#d6d6d6
| 581888 ||  || — || December 16, 2007 || Mount Lemmon || Mount Lemmon Survey ||  || align=right | 2.2 km || 
|-id=889 bgcolor=#E9E9E9
| 581889 ||  || — || June 12, 2015 || Mount Lemmon || Mount Lemmon Survey ||  || align=right | 1.3 km || 
|-id=890 bgcolor=#d6d6d6
| 581890 ||  || — || June 12, 2015 || Haleakala || Pan-STARRS ||  || align=right | 2.6 km || 
|-id=891 bgcolor=#d6d6d6
| 581891 ||  || — || June 7, 2015 || Mount Lemmon || Mount Lemmon Survey ||  || align=right | 2.3 km || 
|-id=892 bgcolor=#E9E9E9
| 581892 ||  || — || April 4, 2014 || Kitt Peak || Spacewatch ||  || align=right | 2.0 km || 
|-id=893 bgcolor=#d6d6d6
| 581893 ||  || — || June 7, 2015 || Haleakala || Pan-STARRS ||  || align=right | 2.2 km || 
|-id=894 bgcolor=#d6d6d6
| 581894 ||  || — || June 10, 2015 || Haleakala || Pan-STARRS ||  || align=right | 2.4 km || 
|-id=895 bgcolor=#d6d6d6
| 581895 ||  || — || June 14, 2015 || Mount Lemmon || Mount Lemmon Survey ||  || align=right | 2.6 km || 
|-id=896 bgcolor=#d6d6d6
| 581896 ||  || — || June 15, 2015 || Haleakala || Pan-STARRS ||  || align=right | 2.1 km || 
|-id=897 bgcolor=#d6d6d6
| 581897 ||  || — || June 7, 2015 || Mount Lemmon || Mount Lemmon Survey ||  || align=right | 2.2 km || 
|-id=898 bgcolor=#E9E9E9
| 581898 ||  || — || March 25, 2015 || Mount Lemmon || Mount Lemmon Survey ||  || align=right | 1.3 km || 
|-id=899 bgcolor=#d6d6d6
| 581899 ||  || — || October 1, 2005 || Mount Lemmon || Mount Lemmon Survey ||  || align=right | 2.9 km || 
|-id=900 bgcolor=#d6d6d6
| 581900 ||  || — || January 12, 2013 || Bergisch Gladbach || W. Bickel ||  || align=right | 2.7 km || 
|}

581901–582000 

|-bgcolor=#E9E9E9
| 581901 ||  || — || August 5, 2011 || Piszkesteto || A. Pál ||  || align=right | 2.1 km || 
|-id=902 bgcolor=#d6d6d6
| 581902 ||  || — || June 16, 2015 || Haleakala || Pan-STARRS ||  || align=right | 2.7 km || 
|-id=903 bgcolor=#d6d6d6
| 581903 ||  || — || August 30, 2005 || Palomar || NEAT ||  || align=right | 2.8 km || 
|-id=904 bgcolor=#d6d6d6
| 581904 ||  || — || December 16, 2012 || ESA OGS || ESA OGS ||  || align=right | 3.0 km || 
|-id=905 bgcolor=#d6d6d6
| 581905 ||  || — || August 8, 2004 || Palomar || NEAT ||  || align=right | 2.8 km || 
|-id=906 bgcolor=#E9E9E9
| 581906 ||  || — || March 21, 2015 || Haleakala || Pan-STARRS ||  || align=right data-sort-value="0.94" | 940 m || 
|-id=907 bgcolor=#d6d6d6
| 581907 ||  || — || October 27, 2011 || Mount Lemmon || Mount Lemmon Survey ||  || align=right | 3.1 km || 
|-id=908 bgcolor=#d6d6d6
| 581908 ||  || — || September 18, 2010 || Mount Lemmon || Mount Lemmon Survey ||  || align=right | 2.7 km || 
|-id=909 bgcolor=#E9E9E9
| 581909 ||  || — || February 20, 2014 || Mount Lemmon || Mount Lemmon Survey ||  || align=right | 1.5 km || 
|-id=910 bgcolor=#d6d6d6
| 581910 ||  || — || August 21, 2006 || Kitt Peak || Spacewatch ||  || align=right | 2.1 km || 
|-id=911 bgcolor=#E9E9E9
| 581911 ||  || — || February 15, 2010 || Kitt Peak || Spacewatch ||  || align=right | 2.2 km || 
|-id=912 bgcolor=#d6d6d6
| 581912 ||  || — || October 27, 2012 || Mount Lemmon || Mount Lemmon Survey ||  || align=right | 3.8 km || 
|-id=913 bgcolor=#d6d6d6
| 581913 ||  || — || May 15, 2015 || Haleakala || Pan-STARRS ||  || align=right | 2.0 km || 
|-id=914 bgcolor=#d6d6d6
| 581914 ||  || — || October 2, 2006 || Mount Lemmon || Mount Lemmon Survey ||  || align=right | 3.6 km || 
|-id=915 bgcolor=#d6d6d6
| 581915 ||  || — || October 2, 2006 || Mount Lemmon || Mount Lemmon Survey ||  || align=right | 2.7 km || 
|-id=916 bgcolor=#d6d6d6
| 581916 ||  || — || October 3, 2011 || Mount Lemmon || Mount Lemmon Survey ||  || align=right | 2.7 km || 
|-id=917 bgcolor=#E9E9E9
| 581917 ||  || — || September 11, 2007 || Kitt Peak || Spacewatch ||  || align=right | 1.9 km || 
|-id=918 bgcolor=#d6d6d6
| 581918 ||  || — || May 26, 2015 || Haleakala || Pan-STARRS ||  || align=right | 2.9 km || 
|-id=919 bgcolor=#d6d6d6
| 581919 ||  || — || May 21, 2015 || Haleakala || Pan-STARRS ||  || align=right | 2.0 km || 
|-id=920 bgcolor=#d6d6d6
| 581920 ||  || — || May 22, 2015 || Haleakala || Pan-STARRS ||  || align=right | 2.2 km || 
|-id=921 bgcolor=#d6d6d6
| 581921 ||  || — || September 25, 2011 || Haleakala || Pan-STARRS ||  || align=right | 2.2 km || 
|-id=922 bgcolor=#d6d6d6
| 581922 ||  || — || March 3, 2009 || Kitt Peak || Spacewatch ||  || align=right | 2.0 km || 
|-id=923 bgcolor=#d6d6d6
| 581923 ||  || — || September 20, 2011 || Kitt Peak || Spacewatch ||  || align=right | 2.4 km || 
|-id=924 bgcolor=#d6d6d6
| 581924 ||  || — || June 18, 2015 || Haleakala || Pan-STARRS ||  || align=right | 2.7 km || 
|-id=925 bgcolor=#E9E9E9
| 581925 ||  || — || May 29, 2011 || Kitt Peak || Spacewatch ||  || align=right data-sort-value="0.81" | 810 m || 
|-id=926 bgcolor=#d6d6d6
| 581926 ||  || — || December 11, 2012 || Mount Lemmon || Mount Lemmon Survey ||  || align=right | 2.0 km || 
|-id=927 bgcolor=#d6d6d6
| 581927 ||  || — || May 18, 2015 || Haleakala || Pan-STARRS ||  || align=right | 2.0 km || 
|-id=928 bgcolor=#d6d6d6
| 581928 ||  || — || February 24, 2014 || Haleakala || Pan-STARRS ||  || align=right | 2.5 km || 
|-id=929 bgcolor=#E9E9E9
| 581929 ||  || — || June 18, 2015 || Haleakala || Pan-STARRS ||  || align=right | 1.1 km || 
|-id=930 bgcolor=#d6d6d6
| 581930 ||  || — || May 26, 2015 || Mount Lemmon || Mount Lemmon Survey ||  || align=right | 2.0 km || 
|-id=931 bgcolor=#E9E9E9
| 581931 ||  || — || March 28, 2015 || Haleakala || Pan-STARRS ||  || align=right data-sort-value="0.86" | 860 m || 
|-id=932 bgcolor=#d6d6d6
| 581932 ||  || — || January 11, 2008 || Kitt Peak || Spacewatch ||  || align=right | 2.8 km || 
|-id=933 bgcolor=#d6d6d6
| 581933 ||  || — || September 24, 2011 || Haleakala || Pan-STARRS ||  || align=right | 2.4 km || 
|-id=934 bgcolor=#d6d6d6
| 581934 ||  || — || February 3, 2009 || Kitt Peak || Spacewatch ||  || align=right | 1.9 km || 
|-id=935 bgcolor=#d6d6d6
| 581935 ||  || — || June 18, 2015 || Haleakala || Pan-STARRS ||  || align=right | 2.0 km || 
|-id=936 bgcolor=#d6d6d6
| 581936 ||  || — || January 20, 2009 || Kitt Peak || Spacewatch ||  || align=right | 1.8 km || 
|-id=937 bgcolor=#E9E9E9
| 581937 ||  || — || June 17, 2015 || Haleakala || Pan-STARRS ||  || align=right | 1.1 km || 
|-id=938 bgcolor=#E9E9E9
| 581938 ||  || — || June 17, 2015 || Haleakala || Pan-STARRS ||  || align=right | 2.2 km || 
|-id=939 bgcolor=#E9E9E9
| 581939 ||  || — || October 26, 2011 || Haleakala || Pan-STARRS ||  || align=right | 1.7 km || 
|-id=940 bgcolor=#d6d6d6
| 581940 ||  || — || June 7, 2015 || Mount Lemmon || Mount Lemmon Survey ||  || align=right | 2.1 km || 
|-id=941 bgcolor=#d6d6d6
| 581941 ||  || — || June 19, 2015 || Haleakala || Pan-STARRS ||  || align=right | 2.8 km || 
|-id=942 bgcolor=#E9E9E9
| 581942 ||  || — || June 12, 2015 || Mount Lemmon || Mount Lemmon Survey ||  || align=right | 1.3 km || 
|-id=943 bgcolor=#d6d6d6
| 581943 ||  || — || October 26, 2011 || Haleakala || Pan-STARRS ||  || align=right | 3.2 km || 
|-id=944 bgcolor=#E9E9E9
| 581944 ||  || — || December 29, 2008 || Kitt Peak || Spacewatch ||  || align=right | 1.8 km || 
|-id=945 bgcolor=#d6d6d6
| 581945 ||  || — || October 1, 2010 || Kitt Peak || Spacewatch ||  || align=right | 1.8 km || 
|-id=946 bgcolor=#d6d6d6
| 581946 ||  || — || April 29, 2009 || Kitt Peak || Spacewatch ||  || align=right | 2.9 km || 
|-id=947 bgcolor=#d6d6d6
| 581947 ||  || — || February 8, 2008 || Kitt Peak || Spacewatch ||  || align=right | 2.0 km || 
|-id=948 bgcolor=#d6d6d6
| 581948 ||  || — || November 17, 2006 || Mount Lemmon || Mount Lemmon Survey ||  || align=right | 2.6 km || 
|-id=949 bgcolor=#d6d6d6
| 581949 ||  || — || September 12, 2005 || Goodricke-Pigott || R. A. Tucker ||  || align=right | 3.1 km || 
|-id=950 bgcolor=#d6d6d6
| 581950 ||  || — || March 9, 2004 || Palomar || NEAT ||  || align=right | 4.1 km || 
|-id=951 bgcolor=#d6d6d6
| 581951 ||  || — || May 16, 2005 || Palomar || NEAT ||  || align=right | 3.3 km || 
|-id=952 bgcolor=#E9E9E9
| 581952 ||  || — || May 21, 2015 || Haleakala || Pan-STARRS 2 ||  || align=right | 1.1 km || 
|-id=953 bgcolor=#d6d6d6
| 581953 ||  || — || March 21, 2015 || Haleakala || Pan-STARRS ||  || align=right | 2.2 km || 
|-id=954 bgcolor=#d6d6d6
| 581954 ||  || — || June 15, 2015 || Haleakala || Pan-STARRS ||  || align=right | 3.8 km || 
|-id=955 bgcolor=#d6d6d6
| 581955 ||  || — || June 21, 1998 || Kitt Peak || Spacewatch ||  || align=right | 2.1 km || 
|-id=956 bgcolor=#d6d6d6
| 581956 ||  || — || March 5, 2008 || Mount Lemmon || Mount Lemmon Survey ||  || align=right | 2.1 km || 
|-id=957 bgcolor=#d6d6d6
| 581957 ||  || — || October 24, 2011 || Haleakala || Pan-STARRS ||  || align=right | 2.2 km || 
|-id=958 bgcolor=#d6d6d6
| 581958 ||  || — || June 18, 2015 || Haleakala || Pan-STARRS ||  || align=right | 2.2 km || 
|-id=959 bgcolor=#d6d6d6
| 581959 ||  || — || February 21, 2014 || Kitt Peak || Spacewatch ||  || align=right | 2.0 km || 
|-id=960 bgcolor=#d6d6d6
| 581960 ||  || — || June 18, 2015 || Haleakala || Pan-STARRS ||  || align=right | 2.3 km || 
|-id=961 bgcolor=#E9E9E9
| 581961 ||  || — || April 6, 2010 || Kitt Peak || Spacewatch ||  || align=right | 1.7 km || 
|-id=962 bgcolor=#d6d6d6
| 581962 ||  || — || December 27, 2006 || Mount Lemmon || Mount Lemmon Survey ||  || align=right | 3.3 km || 
|-id=963 bgcolor=#d6d6d6
| 581963 ||  || — || September 23, 2004 || Kitt Peak || Spacewatch ||  || align=right | 2.4 km || 
|-id=964 bgcolor=#E9E9E9
| 581964 ||  || — || September 26, 2011 || Mount Lemmon || Mount Lemmon Survey ||  || align=right | 1.8 km || 
|-id=965 bgcolor=#d6d6d6
| 581965 ||  || — || June 18, 2015 || Haleakala || Pan-STARRS ||  || align=right | 2.2 km || 
|-id=966 bgcolor=#d6d6d6
| 581966 ||  || — || February 15, 2013 || Haleakala || Pan-STARRS ||  || align=right | 2.7 km || 
|-id=967 bgcolor=#d6d6d6
| 581967 ||  || — || April 5, 2014 || Haleakala || Pan-STARRS ||  || align=right | 2.3 km || 
|-id=968 bgcolor=#E9E9E9
| 581968 ||  || — || June 22, 2015 || Haleakala || Pan-STARRS ||  || align=right | 1.9 km || 
|-id=969 bgcolor=#d6d6d6
| 581969 ||  || — || May 21, 2015 || Haleakala || Pan-STARRS ||  || align=right | 2.2 km || 
|-id=970 bgcolor=#d6d6d6
| 581970 ||  || — || January 25, 2009 || Kitt Peak || Spacewatch ||  || align=right | 2.1 km || 
|-id=971 bgcolor=#d6d6d6
| 581971 ||  || — || January 4, 2013 || Cerro Tololo-DECam || CTIO-DECam ||  || align=right | 2.8 km || 
|-id=972 bgcolor=#d6d6d6
| 581972 ||  || — || December 1, 2005 || Mount Lemmon || Mount Lemmon Survey ||  || align=right | 4.0 km || 
|-id=973 bgcolor=#E9E9E9
| 581973 ||  || — || September 21, 2003 || Kitt Peak || Spacewatch ||  || align=right | 1.2 km || 
|-id=974 bgcolor=#fefefe
| 581974 ||  || — || April 24, 2015 || Kitt Peak || Spacewatch ||  || align=right data-sort-value="0.86" | 860 m || 
|-id=975 bgcolor=#d6d6d6
| 581975 ||  || — || May 14, 2015 || Haleakala || Pan-STARRS ||  || align=right | 2.6 km || 
|-id=976 bgcolor=#d6d6d6
| 581976 ||  || — || December 18, 2007 || Mount Lemmon || Mount Lemmon Survey ||  || align=right | 3.1 km || 
|-id=977 bgcolor=#d6d6d6
| 581977 ||  || — || January 5, 2013 || Kitt Peak || Spacewatch ||  || align=right | 3.0 km || 
|-id=978 bgcolor=#d6d6d6
| 581978 ||  || — || December 23, 2012 || Haleakala || Pan-STARRS ||  || align=right | 2.1 km || 
|-id=979 bgcolor=#E9E9E9
| 581979 ||  || — || June 13, 2015 || Mount Lemmon || Mount Lemmon Survey ||  || align=right | 1.3 km || 
|-id=980 bgcolor=#d6d6d6
| 581980 ||  || — || January 27, 2007 || Kitt Peak || Spacewatch ||  || align=right | 2.3 km || 
|-id=981 bgcolor=#d6d6d6
| 581981 ||  || — || June 18, 2015 || Haleakala || Pan-STARRS ||  || align=right | 2.2 km || 
|-id=982 bgcolor=#d6d6d6
| 581982 ||  || — || June 10, 2005 || Kitt Peak || Spacewatch ||  || align=right | 2.8 km || 
|-id=983 bgcolor=#E9E9E9
| 581983 ||  || — || May 5, 2006 || Kitt Peak || Spacewatch ||  || align=right | 1.6 km || 
|-id=984 bgcolor=#E9E9E9
| 581984 ||  || — || June 20, 2015 || Haleakala || Pan-STARRS ||  || align=right | 1.9 km || 
|-id=985 bgcolor=#d6d6d6
| 581985 ||  || — || June 13, 2015 || Haleakala || Pan-STARRS ||  || align=right | 2.6 km || 
|-id=986 bgcolor=#d6d6d6
| 581986 ||  || — || February 2, 2008 || Catalina || CSS ||  || align=right | 2.8 km || 
|-id=987 bgcolor=#d6d6d6
| 581987 ||  || — || May 4, 2014 || Haleakala || Pan-STARRS || 7:4 || align=right | 2.7 km || 
|-id=988 bgcolor=#d6d6d6
| 581988 ||  || — || June 20, 2015 || Haleakala || Pan-STARRS ||  || align=right | 2.3 km || 
|-id=989 bgcolor=#d6d6d6
| 581989 ||  || — || February 13, 2013 || Haleakala || Pan-STARRS ||  || align=right | 3.2 km || 
|-id=990 bgcolor=#d6d6d6
| 581990 ||  || — || January 13, 2013 || ESA OGS || ESA OGS ||  || align=right | 3.2 km || 
|-id=991 bgcolor=#d6d6d6
| 581991 ||  || — || April 30, 2014 || Haleakala || Pan-STARRS ||  || align=right | 2.9 km || 
|-id=992 bgcolor=#E9E9E9
| 581992 ||  || — || June 15, 2015 || Haleakala || Pan-STARRS ||  || align=right | 1.1 km || 
|-id=993 bgcolor=#d6d6d6
| 581993 ||  || — || February 14, 2013 || Haleakala || Pan-STARRS ||  || align=right | 2.5 km || 
|-id=994 bgcolor=#d6d6d6
| 581994 ||  || — || February 28, 2008 || Mount Lemmon || Mount Lemmon Survey ||  || align=right | 2.6 km || 
|-id=995 bgcolor=#FA8072
| 581995 ||  || — || October 7, 2007 || Mount Lemmon || Mount Lemmon Survey ||  || align=right data-sort-value="0.65" | 650 m || 
|-id=996 bgcolor=#fefefe
| 581996 ||  || — || July 21, 2011 || Haleakala || Pan-STARRS ||  || align=right | 1.2 km || 
|-id=997 bgcolor=#d6d6d6
| 581997 ||  || — || June 28, 2015 || Haleakala || Pan-STARRS ||  || align=right | 3.2 km || 
|-id=998 bgcolor=#d6d6d6
| 581998 ||  || — || November 10, 2005 || Kitt Peak || Spacewatch ||  || align=right | 2.9 km || 
|-id=999 bgcolor=#d6d6d6
| 581999 ||  || — || October 30, 2005 || Mount Lemmon || Mount Lemmon Survey ||  || align=right | 2.7 km || 
|-id=000 bgcolor=#E9E9E9
| 582000 ||  || — || October 19, 2011 || Mount Lemmon || Mount Lemmon Survey ||  || align=right | 1.5 km || 
|}

References

External links 
 Discovery Circumstances: Numbered Minor Planets (580001)–(585000) (IAU Minor Planet Center)

0581